= List of Plasmodium species infecting primates =

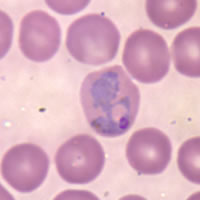
Red blood cell infected with malaria

The Plasmodium species infecting primates include the parasites causing malaria in humans.

== Species ==
Plasmodium billbrayi
Plasmodium billcollinsi
Plasmodium bouillize
Plasmodium brasilianum
Plasmodium bucki
Plasmodium cercopitheci
Plasmodium coatneyi
Plasmodium coulangesi
Plasmodium cynomolgi bastianelli
Plasmodium cynomolgi ceylonensis
Plasmodium cynomolgi cynomolgi
Plasmodium eylesi
Plasmodium falciparum
Plasmodium fieldi
Plasmodium foleyi
Plasmodium fragile
Plasmodium girardi
Plasmodium georgesi
Plasmodium gonderi
Plasmodium gonderi
Plasmodium gora
Plasmodium gorb
Plasmodium inui
Plasmodium jefferyi
Plasmodium joyeuxi
Plasmodium knowlesi
Plasmodium lemuris
Plasmodium malariae
Plasmodium ovale curtisi
Plasmodium ovale wallikeri
Plasmodium percygarnhami
Plasmodium petersi
Plasmodium reichenowi
Plasmodium rodhaini
Plasmodium sandoshami
Plasmodium semnopitheci
Plasmodium schwetzi
Plasmodium silvaticum
Plasmodium simiovale
Plasmodium simium
Plasmodium uilenbergi
Plasmodium vivax
Plasmodium youngei

== Species infecting humans ==
=== Common infections ===
- Plasmodium falciparum (the cause of malignant tertian malaria)
- Plasmodium vivax (the most frequent cause of benign tertian malaria)
- Plasmodium ovale curtisi (another, less frequent, cause of benign tertian malaria)
- Plasmodium ovale wallikeri (another, less frequent, cause of benign tertian malaria)
- Plasmodium malariae (the cause of benign quartan malaria)
- Plasmodium knowlesi (the cause of severe quotidian malaria in Southeast Asia)

=== Rare cases ===
While infection of humans by other species is known, they are quite rare, in some instances, only a single case. In a number of the cases, the means of infection is unknown, and may be due to accident, i.e. infection by laboratory equipment or a bite by an animal. With the use of the polymerase chain reaction additional species have been and are still being identified that infect humans.

- Plasmodium cynomolgi (spp. cynomolgi, bastianellii)
- Plasmodium inui
- Plasmodium schwetzi
- Plasmodium semiovale
- Plasmodium simium

(Plasmodium brasilianum and Plasmodium rhodiani which have been reported to infect humans, are likely synonymous with P. malariae)

One possible experimental infection has been reported with Plasmodium eylesi. Fever and low grade parasitemia were apparent at 15 days. The volunteer (Dr Bennett) had previously been infected by Plasmodium cynomolgi and the infection was not transferable to a gibbon (P. eylesi 's natural host) so this cannot be regarded as definitive evidence of its ability to infect humans. A second case has been reported that may have been a case of P. eylesi but the author was not certain of the infecting species.

A possible infection with Plasmodium tenue has been reported. This report described a case of malaria in a three-year-old black girl from Georgia, United States, who had never been outside the US. She suffered from both P. falciparum and P. vivax malaria and while forms similar to those described for P. tenue were found in her blood even the author was skeptical about the validity of the diagnosis.

Confusingly Plasmodium tenue was proposed in the same year (1914) for a species found in birds. The human species is now considered to be likely to have been a misdiagnosis and the bird species is described on the Plasmodium tenue page.

=== Former names ===
Taxonomy in parasitology until the advent of DNA based methods has always been a problem and revisions in this area are continuing. A number of synonyms have been given for the species infecting humans that are no longer recognised as valid. Since perusal of the older literature may be confusing some currently defunct species names are listed here.

P. camerense

P. causiasium
P. golgi
P. immaculatum
P. laverani var. tertium
P. laverani var. quartum
P. malariae var. immaculatum
P. malariae var. incolor
P. malariae var. irregularis
P. malariae var. parva
P. malariae var. quartanae
P. malariae var. quotidianae
P. perniciosum
P. pleurodyniae
P. praecox
P. quartana
P. quotidianum
P. sedecimanae
P. tenue
P. undecimanae
P. vegesio-tertaniae

P. vivax-minuta

Plasmodium shortii and Plasmodium osmaniae are now considered to be junior synonyms of Plasmodium inui.

=== Notes ===
Falciparum

Until recently the only known host of P. falciparum was humans but this species has also been described in gorillas (Gorilla gorilla) and bonobos There has been a single report of P. falciparum in a brown howler monkey (Alouatta guariba) and in black howler monkeys (Alouatta caraya) but until this is confirmed its validity should be considered dubious.

A possible report of P. falciparum in a greater spot-nosed monkeys (Cercopithecus nictitans) has not been confirmed in a large survey.

A species that clusters with P. falciparum and P. reichenowi has been identified in Gabon, Africa in chimpanzees (Pan troglodytes). This appears to have diverged from these two species about 21 million years ago. It has only been identified from the sequence of its mitochondrion to date and further work is needed to characterise the species. A second report has confirmed the existence of this species in chimpanzees. A third report has confirmed the existence of this species.

Night monkeys (Aotus nigriceps) can be infected with P. falciparum. This infection may occur naturally. Their potential role - if any - as a source of human infection is unknown.

Two additional species within the subgenus Laverania have been identified on the basis of DNA sequences alone: Plasmodium billbrayi and Plasmodium billcollinsi. and bonobos P. billbrayi was found in two subspecies of chimpanzee (Pan troglodytes troglodytes and Pan troglodytes schweinfurthii). P. billcollinsi was found in only one subspecies of chimpanzee (Pan troglodytes troglodytes). Further work is needed to characterise these species.

Malariae

Humans are currently considered to be the only host for P. malariae. However Rodhain and Dellaert in the 1940s showed with transmission studies that P. malariae was present in chimpanzees. The presence of P. malaria in chimpanzees has been reported in Japan suggesting that this species may be able to act as a host. A second paper has described the presence of P. malaria in wild chimpanzees. Another paper has reported several cases of P. malariae in brown howler monkey (Alouatta guariba) and black howler monkeys (Alouatta caraya) It has been shown that splectomised three-striped night monkey (Aotus trivirgatus) can be infected with P. malariae. Another paper has confirmed the presence of P. malaria in chimpanzees.

The existence of multiple independent reports seem to suggest that the chimpanzee and possibly other species may act as a host to P. malaria at least occasionally.

Vivax

P. vivax will infect chimpanzees. Infection tends to be low grade but may be persistent and remain as source of parasites for humans for some time. P. vivax is also known to infect orangutans and the brown howler monkey (Alouatta guariba clamitans) P. vivax has been reported from chimpanzees living in the wild. It has been suggested that vivax infection of the great apes in Africa may act as a reservoir given the prevalence of Duffy antigen negative humans in this area.

Ovale

Like P. vivax, P. ovale has been shown to be transmittable to chimpanzees. P. ovale has an unusual distribution pattern being found in Africa, Myanmar the Philippines and New Guinea. In spite of its admittedly poor transmission to chimpanzees given its discontigous spread, it is suspected that P. ovale may in fact be a zoonosis with an as yet unidentified host. If this is actually the case, the host seems likely to be a primate. A report has been published suggesting that P. ovale may be a natural parasite of chimpanzees but this needs confirmation. P. ovale has since been described from chimpanzees living in the wild. This suggests that human infection with this species may as previously suspected be a zoonosis.

It has been recently shown that P. ovale is actually two genetically distinct species that coexist. These species are Plasmodium ovale curtisi and Plasmodium ovale wallikeri. These two species separated between 1.0 and 3.5 million years ago.

Knowlesi

Plasmodium knowlesi has a natural reservoir in the macaques of Southeast Asia, and was only in 1965 identified as being transmissible to humans.

Other species

The remaining species capable of infecting humans all have other primate hosts.

== Plasmodium taxonomy ==
- P. cynomolgi - P. cynomolgi bastianelli, P. cynomolgi ceylonensis and P. cynomolgi cynomolgi.
- P. inui - P. inui inui and P. inui shortii
- P. knowlesi - P. knowlesi edesoni and P. knowlesi knowlesi.
- P. ovale - P. ovale curtisi and P. ovale wallikeri
- P. vivax - P. vivax hibernans, P. vivax chesson and P. vivax multinucleatum.

Interrelatedness - The evolution of these species is still being worked out and the relationships given here should be regarded as tentative. This grouping, while originally made on morphological grounds, now has considerable support at the DNA level.

- P. brasilianum, P. inui and P. rodhaini are similar to P. malariae (quartan malaria group)
- P. cynomolgi, P. fragile, P. knowlesi, P. simium and P. schwetzi are similar to P. vivax
- P. fieldi and P. simiovale are similar to P. ovale
- P. falciparum is closely related to P. reichenowi.

=== Notes ===
- P. kochi has been described as a parasite of monkeys. This species is currently classified as Hepatocystis kochi. This may be subject to revision.
- P. brasilianum and P. rodhaini seem likely to be the same species as P. malariae.
- P. lemuris may actually belong to the genus Haemoproteus. Clarification of this point awaits DNA examination.
- P. shortii is currently (2007) regarded as a junior synonym of P. inui.

=== Subspecies ===
Many species of Plasmodium which infect primates have been divided into subspecies. Examples are listed below:

Subspecies infecting primates
*P. cynomolgi — P. cynomolgi bastianelli and P. cynomolgi ceylonensis.
- P. inui — P. inui inui and P. inui shortii
- P. knowlesi — P. knowlesi edesoni and P. knowlesi knowlesi.
- P. vivax — P. vivax hibernans, P. vivax chesson and P. vivax multinucleatum.

== Species infecting other hosts ==
Most if not all Plasmodium species infect more than one host: the host records shown here should be regarded as incomplete.

- P. billbrayi - chimpanzees (Pan troglodytes troglodytes, Pan troglodytes schweinfurthii)
- P. billcollinsi - chimpanzees (Pan troglodytes troglodytes, Pan troglodytes schweinfurthii)
- P. bouillize - Cercopithecis campbelli
- P. brasilianum - Alouatta fusca, Alouatta palliata, Alouatta seniculus straminea, Alouatta villosa, several night monkey (Aotus) species, Aotus nigriceps, Ateles fusciceps, Ateles geoffroyi, Ateles geoffroyi grisescens, Ateles paniscus, Ateles paniscus paniscus, Ateles paniscus chamek, Brachyteles arachnoides, Callicebus moloch ornatus, Callicebus torquatus, Cebus albifrons, Cebus apella, Cebus capucinus, Cebus capucinus capucinus, Cebus capucinus imitator, Chiropotes chiropotes, Lagothrix cana, Lagothrix infumata, Lagothrix lagotricha, Saimiri boliviense, Saimiri sciureus and Saimiri ustus.
- P. bucki - Lemur macaco macaco
- P. cercopitheci - Cercopithecis nictitans
- P. coatneyi - crab eating macque (Macaca fascicularis) and Javanese long-tailed macaque (Macaca irus), silvered leaf monkey (Presbytis cristatus)
- P. coulangesi - Lemur macaco macaco
- P. cynomolgi - bear macaque (Macaca arctoides), Formosan rock macaque (Macaca cyclopis), crab eating macque (Macaca fascicularis), Javanese long-tailed macaque (Macaca irus), rhesus monkey (Macaca mulatta), southern pig-tailed macaque (Macaca nemestrina), bonnet macaque (Macaca radiata), toque macaque (Macaca sinica), orangutan (Pongo species), silver leaf monkey (Presbytis cristatus) and Hanuman langur (Presbytis entellus)
- P. eylesi - several gibbon (Hylobates) species including Hylobates lar
- P. falciparum - gorillas (Gorilla gorilla), rhesus monkey (Macaca mulatta), bonnet macaque (Macaca radiata), bonobos (Pan paniscus)
- P. fieldi - the crab eating macque (Macaca fascicularis), the rhesus monkey (Macaca mulatta), the pig-tailed macaque (Macaca nemestrina), the bonnet macaque (Macaca radiata) and the baboon (Papio doguera).
- P. foleyi - Lemur fulvus rufus
- P. fragile - Aotus lemurinus griseimembra, Aotus nancymaae, Aotus vociferans, crab eating macque (Macaca fascicularis), rhesus monkey (Macaca mulatta), bonnet macaque (Macaca radiata), toque macaque (Macaca sinica) and Saimiri boliviensis
- P. inui - Formosan rock macaque (Macaca cyclopis), crab eating macque (Macaca fascicularis), Javanese long-tailed macaque (Macaca irus), bonnet macaque (Macaca radiata)
- P. gaboni - chimpanzees (Pan troglodytes)
- P. georgesi - black crested mangabey (Cercocebus albigena)
- P. girardi - Lemur fulvus rufus, Lemur macaco macaco
- P. gonderi - black crested mangabey (Cercocebus albigena), Cercocebus aterrimus, sooty mangabey (Cercocebus atys), Tana River mangabey (Cercocebus galeritus agilus), crab eating macque (Macaca fascicularis) and drills (Mandrillus leucophaeus)
- P. gora - gorillas (Gorilla gorilla)
- P. gorb - gorillas (Gorilla gorilla)
- P. hylobati - several gibbon (Hylobates) species including Hylobates lar and Hylobates moloch
- P. inui - Aotus lemurinus griseimembra, Aotus nancymaae, Celebes black ape (Cynopithecus niger), Assamese macques (Macaca assamensis), crab eating macque (Macaca fascicularis), rhesus monkey (Macaca mulatta), southern pig-tailed macaque (Macaca nemestrina), bonnet macaque (Macaca radiata), several Presbytis species, Saimiri boliviensis
- P. jefferyi - several gibbon (Hylobates) species
- P. joyeuxi - Cercopithecis callitricus
- P. knowlesi - crab eating macque (Macaca fascicularis), pig-tailed macaque (Macaca nemestrina) and Presbytis malalophus
- P. knowlesi edesoni - Javanese long-tailed macaque (Macaca irus)
- P. lemuris - lemurs (Lemur collaris, Lemur macaco macaco)
- P. lomamiensis - bonobos (Pan paniscus)
- P. malagasi - lemurs
- P. malariae - brown howler monkey (Alouatta guariba clamitans), black howler monkey (Alouatta caraya) chimpanzee
- P. ovale - chimpanzees (Pan)
- P. percygarnhami - Lemur macaco macaco
- P. petersi - black crested mangabey (Cercocebus albigena)
- P. pitheci - orangutans (Pongo pygmaeus)
- P. reichenowi - chimpanzee (Pan) species and gorilla (Gorilla) species
- P. rodhaini - chimpanzee (Pan) species and gorilla (Gorilla) species
- P. sandoshami - Malayan flying lemur (Cynocephalus variegatus)
- P. semnopitheci - northern plains gray langur (Semnopithecus entellus)
- P. schwetzi - chimpanzee (Pan) species and gorilla (Gorilla) species
- P. semiovale - toque macaque (Macaca sinica)
- P. shortii - bonnet macaque (Macaca radiata) and toque macaque (Macaca sinica)
- P. silvaticum - orangutans (Pongo pygmaeus)
- P. simium - several howler monkeys (Alouatta) species including the brown howler monkey (Alouatta fusca) and woolly spider monkey (Brachyteles arachnoides)
- P. uilenbergi - Lemur fulvus fulvus
- P. vivax - orangutans (Pongo species), chimpanzees (Pan), monkeys Saimiri boliviensis, Aotus lemurinus griseimambra, the brown howler monkey (Alouatta guariba clamitans) and tamarins (Saguinus mystax and Saguinus fuscicollis)
- P. youngei - white handed gibbon (Hylobates lar)

It has been proposed that the species P. gora and P. gorb should be renamed P. adleri and P. blacklocki respectively.

== Primate groups and Plasmodium species ==
New World monkeys of the family Cebidae: P. brasilianum and P. simium

Old World monkeys of the family Cercopithecidae: P. coatneyi, P. cynomolgi, P. fieldi, P. fragile, P.gonderi, P. georgesi, P. inui, P. knowlesi, P. petersi, P. shortti and P. simiovale

Gibbons of the family Hylobatidae: P. eylesi, P. hylobati, P. jefferyi and P. youngi

Orangutans (Pongo): P. pitheci and P. silvaticum

Gorillas and chimpanzees: P. billcollini, P. billbrayii, P. falciparum, P. gabonensi, P. gora, P. gorb, P. reichenowi, P. rodhaini and P. schwetzi

== Mosquitoes known to transmit human malaria listed by region ==
This listing may be incomplete as the taxonomy of this genus is under revision.

North American

- Anopheles (Anopheles) freeborni
- Anopheles (Anopheles) quadrimaculatus
- Anopheles (Nyssorhynchus) albimarus

Central American

- Anopheles (Anopheles) aztecus
- Anopheles (Anopheles) punctimacula
- Anopheles (Anopheles) pseudopunctipennis
- Anopheles (Nyssorhynchus) albimanus
- Anopheles (Nyssorhynchus) albitarsis
- Anopheles (Nyssorhynchus) aquasalis
- Anopheles (Nyssorhynchus) argyritarsis
- Anopheles (Nyssorhynchus) darlingi

South American

- Anopheles (Anopheles) pseudopunctipennis
- Anopheles (Anopheles) punctimacula
- Anopheles (Kerteszia) bellator
- Anopheles (Kerteszia) cruzii
- Anopheles (Kerteszia) neivai
- Anopheles (Nyssorhynchus) albimanus
- Anopheles (Nyssorhynchus) albitarsis
- Anopheles (Nyssorhynchus) aquasalis
- Anopheles (Nyssorhynchus) argyritarsis
- Anopheles (Nyssorhynchus) braziliensis
- Anopheles (Nyssorhynchus) darlingi
- Anopheles (Nyssorhynchus) nuneztovari
- Anopheles (Nyssorhynchus) triannulatus

North Eurasian

- Anopheles (Anopheles) atroparvus
- Anopheles (Anopheles) messeae
- Anopheles (Anopheles) sacharovi
- Anopheles (Anopheles) sinensis
- Anopheles (Cellia) pattoni

Mediterranean

- Anopheles (Anopheles) atroparvus
- Anopheles (Anopheles) claviger
- Anopheles (Anopheles) labranchiae
- Anopheles (Anopheles) messeae
- Anopheles (Anopheles) sacharovi
- Anopheles (Cellia) Hispaniola
- Anopheles (Cellia) superpictus

Afro-Arabian

- Anopheles (Cellia) culicifacies
- Anopheles (Cellia) fluviatilis
- Anopheles (Cellia) Hispaniola
- Anopheles (Cellia) multicolor
- Anopheles (Cellia) pharoensis
- Anopheles (Cellia) sergentii

Afrotropical

- Anopheles (Cellia) arabiensis
- Anopheles (Cellia) funestus
- Anopheles (Cellia) gambiae
- Anopheles (Cellia) melas
- Anopheles (Cellia) merus
- Anopheles (Cellia) moucheti
- Anopheles (Cellia) nili
- Anopheles (Cellia) pharoensis

Indo-Iranian

- Anopheles (Anopheles) sacharovi
- Anopheles (Cellia) aconitus
- Anopheles (Cellia) annularis
- Anopheles (Cellia) culicifacies
- Anopheles (Cellia) fluviatilis
- Anopheles (Cellia) jeyporiensis
- Anopheles (Cellia) minimus
- Anopheles (Cellia) philippinensis
- Anopheles (Cellia) pulcherrimus
- Anopheles (Cellia) stephensi
- Anopheles (Cellia) sundaicus
- Anopheles (Cellia) superpictus
- Anopheles (Cellia) tessellatus
- Anopheles (Cellia) varuna

Indo-Chinese hills

- Anopheles (Anopheles) nigerrimus
- Anopheles (Cellia) annularis
- Anopheles (Cellia) culicifacies
- Anopheles (Cellia) dirus
- Anopheles (Cellia) fluviatilis
- Anopheles (Cellia) jeyporiensis
- Anopheles (Cellia) maculatus
- Anopheles (Cellia) minimus

Malaysian

- Anopheles (Anopheles) campestris
- Anopheles (Anopheles) conaldi
- Anopheles (Anopheles) donaldi
- Anopheles (Anopheles) letifer
- Anopheles (Anopheles) nigerrimus
- Anopheles (Anopheles) whartoni
- Anopheles (Cellia) acconitus
- Anopheles (Cellia) balabacensis
- Anopheles (Cellia) dirus
- Anopheles (Cellia) flavirostris
- Anopheles (Cellia) jeyporiensis
- Anopheles (Cellia) leucosphyrus
- Anopheles (Cellia) ludlowae
- Anopheles (Cellia) maculatus
- Anopheles (Cellia) mangyanu
- Anopheles (Cellia) minimus
- Anopheles (Cellia) philippiensis
- Anopheles (Cellia) subpictus
- Anopheles (Cellia) sundaicus

Chinese

- Anopheles (Anopheles) anthropophagus
- Anopheles (Anopheles) sinensis
- Anopheles (Cellia) balabacensis
- Anopheles (Cellia) jeyporiensis
- Anopheles (Cellia) pattoni

Australasian

- Anopheles (Anopheles) bacroftii
- Anopheles (Cellia) farauti type 1
- Anopheles (Cellia) farauti type 2
- Anopheles (Cellia) hilli
- Anopheles (Cellia) karwari
- Anopheles (Cellia) koliensis
- Anopheles (Cellia) punctulatus
- Anopheles (Cellia) subpictus

== Primate mosquito vectors and associated Plasmodium species ==
- Anopheles (Nyssorhynchus) albimanus - P. fieldi, P. vivax
- Anopheles (Nyssorhynchus) albitarsis - P. vivax
- Anopheles (Nyssorhynchus) aquasalis - P. vivax
- Anopheles (Cellia) arabensis - P. falciparum
- Anopheles (Nyssorhynchus) argyritarsi - P. vivax
- Anopheles (Anopheles) argyropus - P. fieldi
- Anopheles (Anopheles) artemievi - P. vivax
- Anopheles (Anopheles) atroparvus - P. fieldi, P. vivax
- Anopheles (Anopheles) aztecus - P. vivax
- Anopheles (Cellia) baimaii - P. vivax
- Anopheles (Cellia) balabacensis - P. fieldi, P. vivax
- Anopheles (Anopheles) beklemishevi - P. vivax
- Anopheles (Kerteszia) bellator - P. vivax
- Anopheles (Nyssorhynchus) benarrochi - P. vivax
- Anopheles (Kertezia) bifurcatus - P. vivax
- Anopheles (Nyssorhynchus) braziliensis - P. vivax
- Anopheles (Kertezia) claviger - P. vivax
- Anopheles (Anopheles) coustani - P. falciparum
- Anopheles (Kerteszia) cruzii - P. vivax
- Anopheles (Cellia) culicifacies - P. vivax
- Anopheles (Nyssorhynchus) darlingi - P. falciparum, P. vivax
- Anopheles (Nyssorhynchus) deaneorum - P. falciparum, P. vivax
- Anopheles (Cellia) dirus - P. cynomolgi, P. fieldi, P. falciparum, P. inui, P. vivax
- Anopheles (Anopheles) donaldi - P. fieldi
- Anopheles (Nyssorhynchus) dunhami - P. vivax
- Anopheles (Cellia) epiroticus - P. vivax
- Anopheles (Cellia) farauti - P. coatneyi, P. vivax
- Anopheles (Cellia) flavirostris - P. vivax
- Anopheles (Anopheles) freeborni - P. fieldi, P. vivax
- Anopheles (Cellia) funestus - P. falciparum
- Anopheles (Cellia) fluviatilis - P. vivax
- Anopheles (Cellia) gambiae - P. falciparum, P. vivax
- Anopheles (Cellia) hackeri - P. fieldi, P. knowlesi
- Anopheles (Kerteszia) homunculus - P. vivax
- Anopheles (Anopheles) hyrcanus - P. vivax
- Anopheles (Cellia) introlatus - P. cynomolgi, P. eylesi
- Anopheles (Anopheles) kleini - P. vivax
- Anopheles (Cellia) kochi - P. eylesi, P. fieldi
- Anopheles (Cellia) latens - P. knowlesi
- Anopheles (Anopheles) lesteri - P. eylesi
- Anopheles (Anopheles) letifer - P. eylesi, P. fieldi
- Anopheles (Cellia) leucosphyrus - P. eylesi, P. vivax
- Anopheles (Cellia) maculatus - P. eylesi, P. fieldi, P. inui, P. vivax, P. youngei
- Anopheles (Nyssorhynchus) marajoara - P. vivax
- Anopheles (Anopheles) maculipennis - P. vivax
- Anopheles (Anopheles) martinius - P. vivax
- Anopheles (Anopheles) mediopunctatus - P. falciparum, P. vivax
- Anopheles (Cellia) melas - P. falciparum
- Anopheles (Cellia) merus - P. falciparum
- Anopheles (Anopheles) messeae - P. vivax
- Anopheles (Cellia) minimus - P. vivax
- Anopheles (Cellia) moucheti - P. falciparum
- Anopheles (Cellia) nili - P. falciparum
- Anopheles (Nyssorhynchus) nuneztovari - P. vivax
- Anopheles (Nyssorhynchus) oswaldoi - P. falciparum, P. vivax
- Anopheles (Anopheles) paludis - P. falciparum
- Anopheles (Anopheles) peditaeniatus - P. fieldi
- Anopheles (Cellia) philippinensis - P. fieldi
- Anopheles (Anopheles) pseudopunctipennis - P. vivax
- Anopheles (Cellia) pulcherrimus - P. vivax
- Anopheles (Anopheles) pullus - P. vivax
- Anopheles (Anopheles) punctimacula - P. vivax
- Anopheles (Anopheles) punctipennis - P. vivax
- Anopheles (Cellia) quadrimaculatus - P. fieldi, P. vivax
- Anopheles (Nyssorhynchus) rangeli - P. vivax
- Anopheles (Cellia) macarthuri - P. eylesi
- Anopheles (Anopheles) roperi - P. eylesi
- Anopheles (Anopheles) sacharovi - P. vivax
- Anopheles (Cellia) sergentii - P. vivax
- Anopheles (Anopheles) sinensis - P. eylesi, P. fieldi, P. vivax
- Anopheles (Cellia) stephensi - P. cynomogli, P. fieldi, P. inui, P. vivax
- Anopheles (Cellia) sundaicus - P. eylesi, P. vivax, P. youngei
- Anopheles (Cellia) superpictus - P. vivax
- Anopheles (Cellia) tessellatus - P. falciparum, P. vivax
- Anopheles (Nyssorhynchus) triannulatus - P. falciparum, P. vivax
- Anopheles (Nyssorhynchus) trinkae - P. vivax
- Anopheles (Anopheles) umbrosus - P. eylesi
- Anopheles (Cellia) vagus - P. eylesi, P. fieldi
