= Plasmodium fieldi =

Scientific classification
- Domain: Eukaryota
- Clade: Sar
- Clade: Alveolata
- Phylum: Apicomplexa
- Class: Aconoidasida
- Order: Haemospororida
- Family: Plasmodiidae
- Genus: Plasmodium
- Species: P. fieldi

Binomial name
- Plasmodium fieldi Eyles, Laing and Fong, 1962

Species of single-celled organism

Plasmodium fieldi is a parasite of the genus Plasmodium sub genus Plasmodium found in Malaysia. This species is related to Plasmodium ovale and Plasmodium simiovale. As in all Plasmodium species, P. fieldi has both vertebrate and insect hosts. The vertebrate hosts for this parasite are primates.

== Description ==
This species was first described by Eyles, Laing and Fong in 1962. The parasite was identified in a pig-tailed macaque (Macaca nemestrina) that Eyles purchased in peninsular Malaysia in mid-August 1960. It was named after the malariologist Dr. John W. Field.

The asexual cycle is 48 hours in length

Ring forms: These measure about 3 micrometres in diameter and double chromatin bodies may be present. Multiple infections of the erythrocyte are uncommon.

Trophozoites: The cytoplasm is compact, staining a deep blue while the nucleus stains deep red. Pigment is dark and made up of fine grains. Schüffner-type stippling also taking a deep red stain appears about halfway through this stage. Older trophozoites are compact, rounded or oval and display very little amoeboidity. The vacuole may be diminished or lost. Aggregates of dark eosinophilic masses sometimes larger than the nuclei may be present. Some host cells are oval-shaped and may be slightly enlarged.

Schizonts: Immature forms have dense blue-staining cytoplasm and relatively large deep red nuclei. The pigment is granular, well-distributed and generally black in colour. Heavy stippling is present. As schizogony proceeds, the eosinophilic masses approximate forming a deep red border around the developing schizont. At this stage the host cell may be appreciably enlarged and some may assume an oval shape. Mature schizonts produce 4 to 16 (mean 12) large merozoites. The golden-brown pigment forms a large mass in the center of the schizont. The host cell may become greatly distorted. This characteristic distortion appears to be distinctive for this parasite.

Gametocytes: Mature macrogametocytes have an off-centre, dark red nucleus. The deep blue cytoplasm has delicate, dark pigment granules scattered within it. The host cell, which may be slightly enlarged, has a red ring of eosinophilic stippling within it. Mature microgametocytes occupy the entire the host cell and have dark pink cytoplasm. The off-center nucleus stains red and has a deep red bar-like mass. Pigment granules are heavy and fairly evenly distributed in the cytoplasm. The host cells show a pronounced stippling and may have fimbriated edges.

Liver stages: These have been studied 6–14 days post infection. The exoerythrocytic bodies are circular to elliptical in shape and measure 20 micrometres in diameter at day 6 and 40–60 micrometres at day 14. The cytoplasm stains pale blue. The nucleus is about 1 micrometre in diameter. There are no morphological features to distinguish them from any other Plasmodium species.

The life cycle in the mosquito has been studied in several species. Although the details differ somewhat between species the outline is broadly similar. The oocysts have a maximum diameter between 30 and 100 micrometres (mean 60 micrometres). Sporozoites appear in the salivary glands about day 14.

Transmission to human volunteers has not been successful.

== Vectors ==
- Anopheles (Nyssorhynchus) albimanus
- Anopheles (Anopheles) argyropus
- Anopheles (Anopheles) atroparvus
- Anopheles (Cellia) balabacensis balabacensis
- Anopheles (Cellia) balabacensis introlatus
- Anopheles (Cellia) dirus
- Anopheles (Anopheles) donaldi
- Anopheles (Anopheles) freeborni
- Anopheles (Cellia) hackeri
- Anopheles (Cellia) kochi
- Anopheles (Anopheles) letifer
- Anopheles (Cellia) maculatus
- Anopheles (Anopheles) peditaeniatus
- Anopheles (Cellia) philippinensis
- Anopheles (Anopheles) quadrimaculatus
- Anopheles (Anopheles) sinensis
- Anopheles (Cellia) stephensi
- Anopheles (Cellia) vagus

== Hosts ==
P. fieldi infects the kra monkey (Macaca irus or Macaca fascicularis ), the rhesus monkey (Macaca mulatta), the pig-tailed macaque (Macaca nemestrina), the bonnet macaque (Macaca radiata) and the baboon (Papio doguera).
