= Plasmodium eylesi =

Scientific classification
- Domain: Eukaryota
- Clade: Sar
- Clade: Alveolata
- Phylum: Apicomplexa
- Class: Aconoidasida
- Order: Haemospororida
- Family: Plasmodiidae
- Genus: Plasmodium
- Species: P. eylesi

Binomial name
- Plasmodium eylesi Warren et al., 1965

Species of single-celled organism

Plasmodium eylesi is a parasite of the genus Plasmodium subgenus Plasmodium.

Like all Plasmodium species P. eylesi has both vertebrate and insect hosts. The vertebrate hosts for this parasite are mammals.

== Description ==
The parasite was first described by Warren et al. in 1965. and is named after the malariologist Dr. Don E. Eyles, Father of the Apollo computer engineer Don Eyles.

It is believed that this species is related to Plasmodium hylobati, Plasmodium jefferyi and Plasmodium youngi but this putative relationship awaits examination by DNA based methods.

The parasite prefers to infect reticulocytes but will infect older erythrocytes. Multiple infections like those of Plasmodium falciparum are common with up to six ring forms.

Almost immediately on infection the erythrocyte enlarges. Schüffner's dots are rapidly apparent. Pigment is scarce, granular and yellowish-brown.

Young schizonts almost fill the host cell except for small areas where Schüffner's dots may be found. Oval shaped forms may occur.

Each schizont may give rise to 20 - 34 merozoites (average: 25).

The mature macrogametocytes which stain a grayish-blue fill the enlarged host cell. Also present is a coarse, granular pigment which is scattered evenly throughout the parasite. The generally oval nucleus is deep staining and may have an adjacent vacuole.

The mature microgametocytes are found within an enlarged, circular to oval, host cell and take a deep brilliant reddish-purple stain. The nucleus stains slightly more deeply. Pigment is scattered throughout the cytoplasm.

The mature oocytes in the mosquito average 53 micrometres (μm) in size (range: 27 to 69 μm). Sporozoites appear in the salivary glands between day 9 and 10 and are infectious by day 12.

== Geographical occurrence ==
This species is found in Malaysia.

== Clinical features and host pathology ==
Vertebrate hosts include the white-handed gibbon (Hylobates lar).

Mosquito vectors of this parasite include Anopheles introlatus, Anopheles kochi, Anopheles lesteri, Anopheles letifer, Anopheles leucosphyrus, Anopheles maculatus, Anopheles roperi, Anopheles riparis macarthuri, Anopheles sinensis, Anopheles sundaicus, Anopheles umbrosus and Anopheles vagus.

One case of possibly human infection is known. In 1968 Dr Gordon F. Bennett was bitten by an infected Anopheles kochi. After 15 days he developed a fever. Parasites were evident in his blood for a week. It was not possible to transfer the infection to a gibbon. Doubts remain about the cause of the fever because Dr Bennett had previous been infected by Plasmodium cynomolgi which is not known to be infectious to gibbons.

A second case reported in 1977 may have been a case of P. eylesi but the author was not certain of the infecting species.
