= Plasmodium inui =

Scientific classification
- Domain: Eukaryota
- Clade: Sar
- Clade: Alveolata
- Phylum: Apicomplexa
- Class: Aconoidasida
- Order: Haemospororida
- Family: Plasmodiidae
- Genus: Plasmodium
- Species: P. inui

Binomial name
- Plasmodium inui Halberstaedter and von Prowazek, 1907

Species of single-celled organism

Plasmodium inui is a species of parasite, one of the species of simian Plasmodium that cause malaria in Old World monkeys.

== History ==
This species was described in 1907 by Halberstaedter and von Prowazek.

== Epidemiology ==
This species is found in China and also the Celebes, Indonesia, Malaysia and the Philippines.

== Phylogenetics ==
It is closely related to other 'quartan' Plasmodium species, including Plasmodium coatneyi, Plasmodium cynomolgi, Plasmodium fragile, Plasmodium fieldi, Plasmodium hylobati, Plasmodium simiovale and Plasmodium vivax (which is a 'tertian' Plasmodium species).

== Vectors ==
- Anopheles dirus

== Hosts ==
- Assamese macaques (Macaca assamensis)
- long tailed macaques (Macaca fascicularis)
