= Plasmodium silvaticum =

Scientific classification
- Domain: Eukaryota
- Clade: Sar
- Clade: Alveolata
- Phylum: Apicomplexa
- Class: Aconoidasida
- Order: Haemospororida
- Family: Plasmodiidae
- Genus: Plasmodium
- Species: P. silvaticum

Binomial name
- Plasmodium silvaticum Garnham, Rajapaksa, Peters and Killick-Kendrick, 1972

Species of single-celled organism

Plasmodium silvaticum is a parasite of the genus Plasmodium subgenus Plasmodium.

Like all Plasmodium species, P. silvaticum has both vertebrate and insect hosts. The vertebrate hosts for this parasite are mammals.

== Description ==
The parasite was first described by Garnham et al in 1972.

It is a member of the vivax group and closely resembles the other members of this group.

== Geographical occurrence ==
This species is found in Borneo.

== Vectors ==
Vectors are Anopheles balabacensis, Anopheles maculatus and Anopheles sundaicus.

== Clinical features and host pathology ==
The parasite has an approximately 48-hour life cycle and gives rise to a tertian fever. The disease itself appears to be mild with little overt pathology.

Its prevalence varies considerably: Wolfe et al found the highest Plasmodium spp. prevalence to be 93.5% (29/31) in captive animals but 11.6% (5/43) in wild orangutans. Despite the apparent lack of pathology, a study of the population genetics of the alpha 2 haemoglobin suggested that this parasite (or others like it) has had a significant selective effect on the orangutan genome.

It can be transmitted both by blood inoculation and by sporozoite inoculation into splenectomized chimpanzees.
