= Plasmodium billcollinsi =

Scientific classification
- Domain: Eukaryota
- Clade: Sar
- Clade: Alveolata
- Phylum: Apicomplexa
- Class: Aconoidasida
- Order: Haemospororida
- Family: Plasmodiidae
- Genus: Plasmodium
- Species: P. billcollinsi

Binomial name
- Plasmodium billcollinsi Krief et al., 2010

Species of single-celled organism

Plasmodium billcollinsi is a species of the genus Plasmodium subgenus Laverania.

It is a parasitic protozoan found in chimpanzees in Central Africa. The parasite is named in honour of the malariologist William E. Collins.

== Taxonomy ==
Both P. billcollinsi and P. billbrayi were suggested based on mtDNA and nuclear gene sequences, in addition to having been obtained from chimpanzee samples. Plasmodium billcollinsi is located at the root between P. falciparum and P. reichenowi.

== Distribution ==
Analysis made on 1,261 samples revealed that at least six Plasmodium species circulate in great apes in Gabon, with P. billcollinsi being found faecal samples from 791 chimpanzees.

== Hosts ==
Along with P. reichenowi, P. billbrayi and P. gaboni, P. billcollinsi infects with malaria to only chimpanzees. The parasite has been found in at least three subspecies: P. t. verus, P. t. troglodytes, and P. t. schweinfurthii.

== See also ==
- List of Plasmodium species infecting primates
