= William Erle Collins =

American parasitologist

William Erle "Bill" Collins (9 July 1929 – 28 September 2013) was an American parasitologist.

Collins grew up in Lansing, Michigan, where he graduated from high school. He received his B.S. and M.Sc. in entomology from Michigan State University and then completed his Ph.D. in 1954 at Rutgers University in two years. After being drafted into the U.S. Army, he did his military service at the U.S. Army Biological Warfare laboratories at Fort Detrick. While stationed there, he married Janet Johnson in July 1956. After leaving the Army he worked at Rutgers University as an extension entomologist. In 1959 he was employed by the U.S. Public Health Service at the National Institute of Allergy and Infectious Diseases (NIAID) in Columbia, South Carolina.

In 1963, the Public Health Service laboratory moved to Atlanta and Dr. Collins' group began working with non-human primates following the discovery that monkey malarias were transmissible to humans. Parasites from monkeys or apes isolated in Asia, South America, and Africa were sent to the laboratory in Chamblee, Georgia, where they were adapted and transmitted to laboratory-maintained primates and their life cycles described and characterized. Transmissions to human volunteers were also attempted.

In 1973 the laboratory operation headed by Collins was transferred to the operational control of the Centers for Disease Control (CDC) and the research emphasis changed from monkey malarial parasites in monkeys to human malarial parasites in monkeys.

Collins did research with many species of malaria parasites, particularly Plasmodium falciparum, P. vivax, and P. simium. ... The scientific community recognized Collins' intensive work in this field naming a subspecies for him, Plasmodium vivax collinsi. He also has a new species of a great ape malaria parasite named after him, Plasmodium billcollinsi.

Collins was infected twice with Plasmodium during his years of laboratory work. He was the author or coauthor of more than 450 scientific publications.

Upon his death he was survived by his widow, two children, and two grandchildren.

== Awards ==
- 1985 — Joseph Augustin LePrince Medal from the American Society of Tropical Medicine and Hygiene (ASTMH)
- 2001 — William C. Watson, Jr. Medal of Excellence from CDC
- 2001 — Harry Hoogstraal Medal from the ASTMH, recognizing lifelong service to medical entomology
- 2012 — Henrique Aragão Medal at the XVIII International Congress of Tropical Medicine and Malaria
