= George Michael James Giles =

English surgeon and entomologist

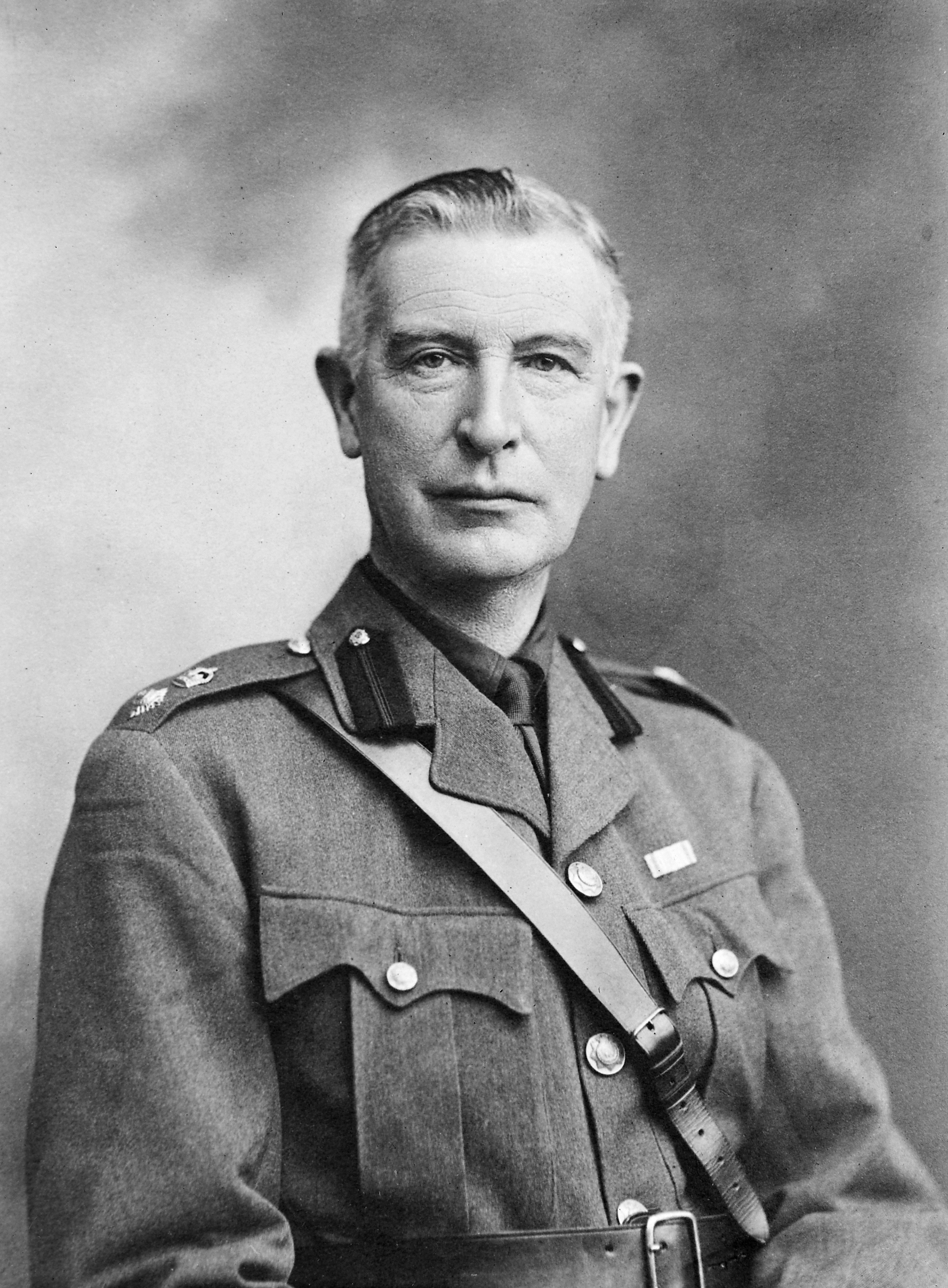

George Michael James Giles (1853 – 1916) was an English surgeon and entomologist who specialised in mosquitoes. He wrote A report of an investigation into the causes of the diseases known in Assam as Kála-Azár and Beri-Beri (1890) and A handbook of the gnats or mosquitoes giving the anatomy and life history of the Culicidae, together with descriptions of all species notices up to the present date (1902, 2nd edition).

Giles described several new species of mosquitoes. Two of the most important are Culex tritaeniorhynchus, described in 1901, and Anopheles culicifacies, described in 1901 with three other species.
