= Plasmodium brasilianum =

Scientific classification
- Domain: Eukaryota
- Clade: Sar
- Clade: Alveolata
- Phylum: Apicomplexa
- Class: Aconoidasida
- Order: Haemospororida
- Family: Plasmodiidae
- Genus: Plasmodium
- Species: P. brasilianum

Binomial name
- Plasmodium brasilianum (Gonder and Von Berenberg-Gossler, 1908)

Species of single-celled organism

Plasmodium brasilianum is a parasite that infects many species of platyrrhine monkeys in South and Central America.

== Description ==
Sequence analysis of circumsporozoite protein, merozoite surface protein-1, and small subunit ribosomal RNA of P. malariae and P. brasilianum showed that the two parasites were very closely related. It is considered plausible that P. brasilianum in platyrrhines is a result of the cross-species transfer of P. malariae brought to the New World by settlers in the post-Columbus era. As P. malariae and P. brasilianum have now been demonstrated to be genetically identical based on 18S rRNA sequences, it has been proposed that P. brasilianum be subsumed under the name P. malariae.

== Distribution ==
Plasmodium brasilianum naturally infects species of primates from all New World monkey families from a large geographic area in Central and South America. The parasite has been found in Panama, Venezuela, Colombia, Peru, Brazil, and French Guiana.

== Hosts ==
Natural infection of P. brasilianum has been found in tamarins and marmosets of the genera Callithrix, Leontopithecus and Mico in the Atlantic forest. Also Anopheles freeborni mosquitoes infected by feeding on a platyrrhine spider monkey (Ateles geoffroyi geoffroyi) from Panama carrying P. brasilianum, have been shown to transmit the parasite through biting to five human volunteers. In addition to humans, P. brasilianum has been transmissible experimentally to marmosets.

== See also ==
- List of Plasmodium species infecting primates
