= Anopheles latens =

Scientific classification
- Kingdom: Animalia
- Phylum: Arthropoda
- Class: Insecta
- Order: Diptera
- Family: Culicidae
- Genus: Anopheles
- Subgenus: Cellia
- Species: A. latens

Binomial name
- Anopheles latens Sallum, Peyton, Wilkerson, 2005

Species of mosquito

The Anopheles latens mosquito (part of the An. leucosphyrus group) is an important vector for the transmission of malaria in humans and monkeys in Southeast Asia. It is an important vector for the transmission of human malaria in Sarawak; but because it is attracted to both humans and to macaques it is also responsible for the transmission of simian malarias to humans (Plasmodium knowlesi and possibly P. inui as well).

Anopheles latens tends to bite from 6 p.m. throughout the night, peaking at midnight. It is found in forests and at forest fringes, but tends not to enter human dwellings.
