= Binder Park Zoo =

- Interactive map of Binder Park Zoo
- 42°14′47.26″N 85°09′18.08″W
- Date opened: 1977
- Location: Battle Creek, Michigan, United States
- Land area: 433 acres (175 ha)
- No. of animals: 500
- No. of species: 140
- Annual visitors: 250,000
- Memberships: AZA,
- Major exhibits: Wild Africa
- Website: www.binderparkzoo.org

The Binder Park Zoo is a 433-acre (175 ha) zoo that opened in 1977 near Battle Creek, Michigan, in the United States. Binder Park Zoo is one of the largest zoos in Michigan, and features a large array of animals and plants, including the Wild Africa Exhibit. It includes a train, a tram, a carousel, and ropes course called "Skylark Ridge".

The Binder Park Zoo is an accredited member of the Association of Zoos and Aquariums (AZA).

== Exhibits ==
=== Main zoo area ===
The main zoo area features various animal exhibits in a more traditional zoo layout. When first entering the zoo, there is an exhibit for red pandas, with indoor and outdoor viewing. There are also Australian animals, such as red kangaroos, red-necked wallbies, and laughing kookaburras, and the Binda Conservation Center. The Binda Conservation Center is a building with adjacent outdoor exhibits for southern ground hornbills and parrots, and indoor exhibits for Linne's two-toed sloth, and various reptiles and amphibians, such as reticulated python, blue-tongued skink, chuckwalla, poison dart frogs, and tree frogs. As you move away from entrance area, there is a central area with double-wattled cassowary, red-crowned crane, several species of lemurs, including ring-tailed lemurs, white ruffed lemurs, collared lemurs. This central area is also home to an eatery called Beulah's Restaurant. To the north of the central area is the Smith Snow Leopard Encounter, which is home to two snow leopards. To the east of the central area, is an area for North American wildlife, including North American black bears, Mexican gray wolves, Canada lynx, bald eagles, and a large, natural wetlands area that is home to a breeding pair of native trumpeter swans. To the south of the central area is the "Zoorassic Park" attraction, completed in 2021, featuring animatronic dinosaurs, a life size statue of an adult brachiosaurus, the Z.O. & O Railroad station, a music garden, and various play areas for children. To the southeast of the central area is the children's zoo area, featuring goat feeding, and petting, black-tailed prairie dogs, and a collection of attractions and amenities, like the Conservation Carousel. The Conservation Carousel opened in 2007, and includes various popular zoo animals such as a polar bear, a tiger, and a bronco; the latter paying homage to the nearby Western Michigan University. There is also has a three-story 48-element ropes course and zipline, called the Charles & Lynn Zhang Skylark Ridge. If you continue going southeast, away from the children's zoo and attractions area, there is a path that takes you to The International Depot, the boarding area for the Complementary Wilderness Tram, that takes visitors to Wild Africa.

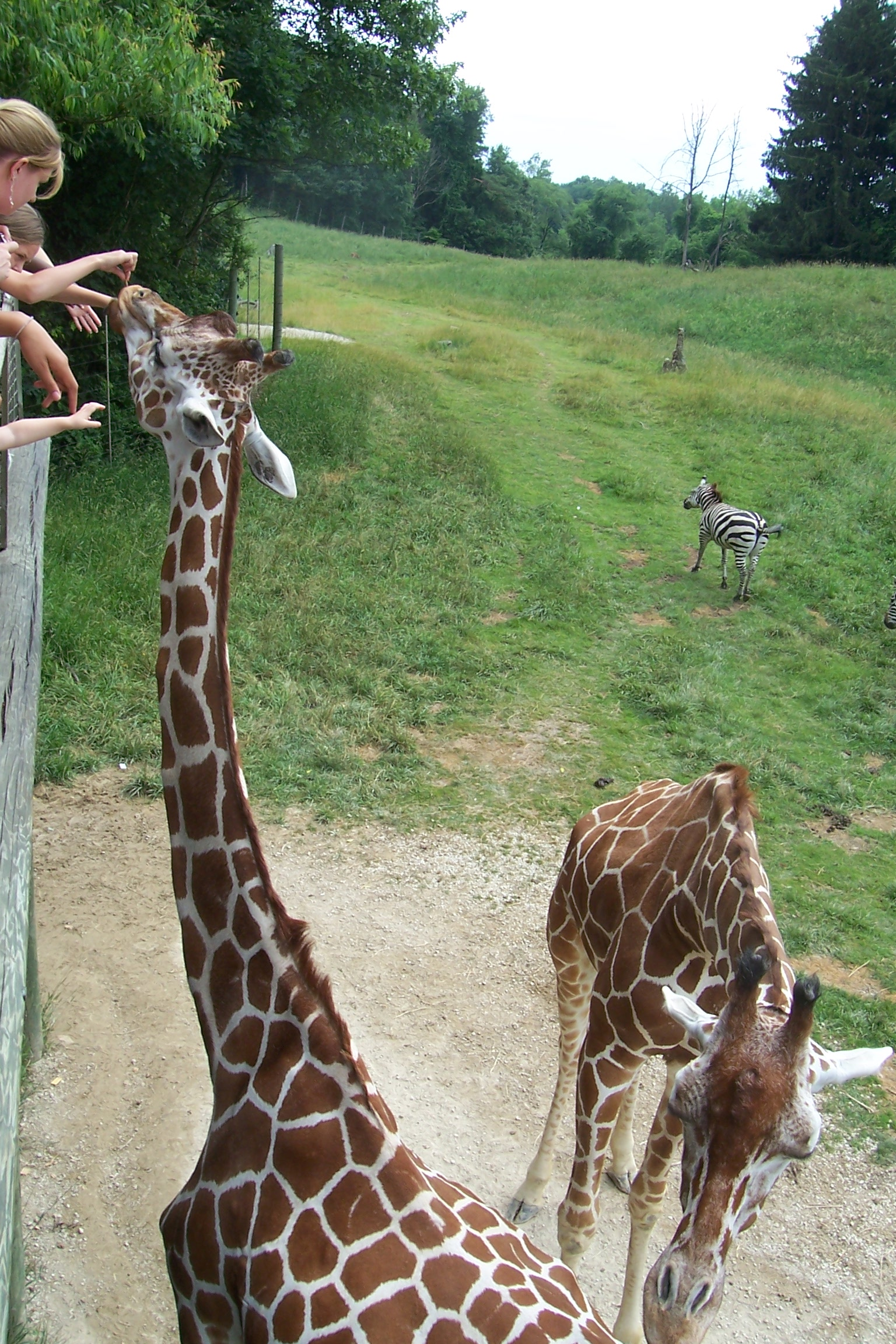
Giraffe feeding in Wild Africa

=== Wild Africa ===
The Wild Africa Exhibit is a large, immersive, and permanent exhibit featuring many species native to Africa in a naturalistic landscape that takes advantage of the location's natural geography. This award-winning exhibit allows the animals to roam, cage free, in an 18-acre (7.3 ha), savanna-like setting, very similar to how they might live in the wild. To get a closer view, there is a one way, 0.8-mile (1.3 km) loop that begins and ends in a small African themed village, selling souvenirs at the Zawadi Traders Gift Shop, and food and beverages at the Kalahari Kitchen Restaurant. The trail itself is themed to resemble a trail inside an African national park, called Zuri National Park, complete with several ranger stations, a safari jeep, and evidence of poaching such as elephant tusks, and the remnant skeleton of an African elephant. Along the trail there is an opportunity to feed giraffes at the Twiga Overlook. Park visitors view the reticulated giraffe herd from a raised platform that places them at eye level with the animals. Leaves of romaine lettuce that are available for purchase can be placed in the palm of one's hand where the giraffes will retrieve them with their 18-inch (460 mm) tongues. Other animals visible in the giraffe exhibit, at the overlook, are common ostriches, Grant's zebras, addaxes, waterbucks, bonteboks, addra gazelles, marabou storks, and cinereous vultures. Further down the trail are various smaller exhibits for cheetahs, red-capped mangabeys, Aldabra giant tortoises, colobus monkeys, black mangabeys, red river hogs, and blue duiker. The trail originally ended with an area for viewing rare African domestics, but this area is currently off limits, and is being reimagined as a new space to open at a later date. Recently added was the Chai Pride Tea Company Plaza, with a seating area, and two separate exhibits for the zoo's resident African wild dog group, and their brand new pride of lions.

The Wild Africa Exhibit is located away from the main zoo exhibits at the west end, accessible by a free zebra-patterned tram, or a 0.5-mile (0.80 km) walking path.

== Special guests ==
In 2003 two koalas from the San Diego Zoo were brought to Binder Park Zoo along with games and activities with an Australian culture twist.

In 2006, Crunch, a 150-year-old, 165-pound (75 kg) alligator snapping turtle was on exhibit at the Conservation Discovery Center from Memorial Day to Labor Day. The turtle is in the care of the Blackwater Turtle Refuge.

During the summer of 2008, there were numerous births at the zoo to animals that are or have been listed as endangered species. In June 2008, there was the birth of a female snow leopard cub and three trumpeter swan cygnets. This was followed by the August birth of a female addra gazelle.
