= Plasmodium gaboni =

Scientific classification
- Domain: Eukaryota
- Clade: Sar
- Clade: Alveolata
- Phylum: Apicomplexa
- Class: Aconoidasida
- Order: Haemospororida
- Family: Plasmodiidae
- Genus: Plasmodium
- Species: P. gaboni

Binomial name
- Plasmodium gaboni Ollomo et al., 2009

Species of single-celled organism

Plasmodium gaboni is a parasite of the genus Plasmodium subgenus Laverania.

P. gaboni was given its name in reference to Gabon, where the parasite was discovered in two wild-borne chimpanzees kept as pets in villages in that country. Plasmodium gaboni is phylogenetically very close to Plasmodium billbrayi.

== Taxonomy ==
In 2009, Ollomo et al. published the complete mitochondrial genome of Plasmodium gaboni, which was not yet named at the time. The parasite belongs to the P falciparum/P reichenowi lineage. It has been proposed that Plasmodium gaboni diverged from the P falciparum/P reichenowi lineage about 21 million years ago, leading to the conclusion that the ancestor of this parasite clade could have been already present in hominid ancestors. Plasmodium gaboni is 10-fold more diverse than human parasite Plasmodium falciparum, indicating a very recent origin of the latter. Plasmodium gaboni is similar to both Plasmodium falciparum and to Plasmodium reichenowi in microscopic studies, seeming likely that all of these ape Laverania parasites represent morphologically indistinguishable species.

== Distribution ==
Plasmodium gaboni can be found in western Africa.

== Hosts ==
Study has confirmed the presence of Plasmodium gaboni in wild chimpanzees (subspecies Pan troglodytes troglodytes and Pan troglodytes vellerosus). Due to the close proximity between Plasmodium gaboni and the most virulent agent of malaria, Plasmodium falciparum, it has been considered the possibility of transfer risk of this species to humans.

== See also ==
- List of Plasmodium species infecting primates
