= Plasmodium youngi =

Scientific classification
- Domain: Eukaryota
- Clade: Sar
- Clade: Alveolata
- Phylum: Apicomplexa
- Class: Aconoidasida
- Order: Haemospororida
- Family: Plasmodiidae
- Genus: Plasmodium
- Species: P. youngi

Binomial name
- Plasmodium youngi Eyles, Fong, Dunn, Guinn, Warren, and Sandosham, 1964

Species of single-celled organism

Plasmodium youngi is a protozoan parasite which can cause malaria in certain primates. It is known to infect and cause severe disease in Malayan gibbons.

== History ==
The parasite was first identified in blood smears from a young Malayan gibbon (Hylobates lar lar) in Kelantan, Malaysia in 1964. It was named after the American malaria researcher Martin D. Young.

== Pathogenesis ==
In the Malayan gibbon, the parasite causes severe malaria. Parasitemia peaks on the 12th and 16th day of infection, with up to 130,000 parasites per milliliter of blood. Parasite load remains fairly high at greater than 10,000 parasites per milliliter of blood for several weeks, before declining. Parasites are still detectable in the blood intermittently for at least 4 months. Major signs of infection are anemia and listlessness.

== Host range ==
Plasmodium youngi can cause severe disease in the Malayan gibbon. It can also infect the Black crested gibbon (Hylobates concolor), although it causes only moderate parasitemia. In experimental infections, rhesus macaques could not be infected with P. youngi. While the mosquito vector of P. youngi is not known, experimental feeding of Anopheles maculatus showed that P. youngi grows poorly in A. maculatus, suggesting it is not the natural vector.
