= Plasmodium coatneyi =

Scientific classification
- Domain: Eukaryota
- Clade: Sar
- Clade: Alveolata
- Phylum: Apicomplexa
- Class: Aconoidasida
- Order: Haemospororida
- Family: Plasmodiidae
- Genus: Plasmodium
- Species: P. coatneyi

Binomial name
- Plasmodium coatneyi Eyles etal., 1962

Species of single-celled organism

Plasmodium coatneyi is a parasitic species that is an agent of malaria in nonhuman primates. P. coatneyi occurs in Southeast Asia. The natural host of this species is the rhesus macaque (Macaca mulatta) and crab-eating macaque (Macaca fascicularis fascicularis), but there has been no evidence that zoonosis of P. coatneyi can occur through its vector, the female Anopheles mosquito.

While P. coatneyi cannot be transmitted to humans, it is similar enough to Plasmodium falciparum to warrant laboratory study as a model species.

== History ==
Plasmodium coatneyi was first discovered in 1961 by Dr. Don Eyles in the Malaysian state of Selangor. Plasmodium coatneyi was isolated from an Anopheles hackeri before being found in its primate host species. This was the first occurrence of acquiring a new form of malaria through its vector instead of an infected host specimen. The sample was first thought to be Plasmodium knowlesi due to the morphological similarities of the two species, but was later identified as separate due to having a tertiary periodicity compared to P. knowlesi’s quartan periodicity. The presence of P. coatneyi in a host was confirmed in 1963 by Dr. Eyles and his team when the protozoan was discovered in a crab-eating monkey found in the same area Selangor and again in a separate crab-eating monkey in the Philippines. The newly discovered species was then named in honor of Dr. G. Robert Coatney, an American malariologist.

== Life Cycle ==
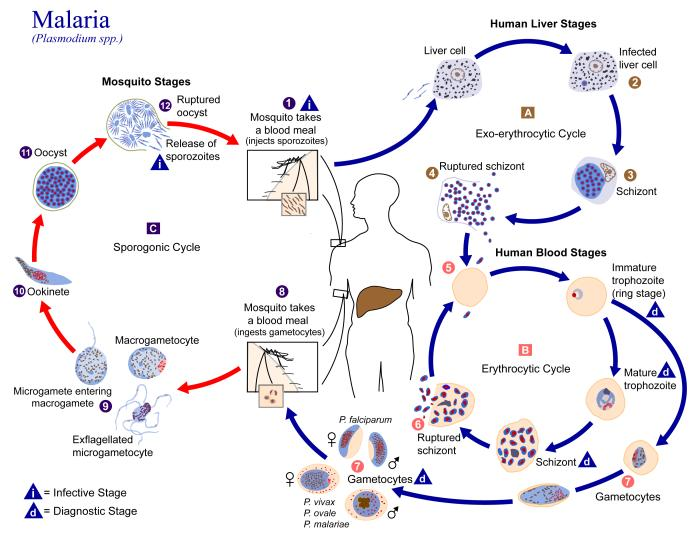
Chart of the genus Plasmodium life cycle.

The life cycle of P. coatneyi takes the complex form representative of the genus Plasmodium. When a female Anopheles mosquito bites a human, a haploid form of the protozoan called a sporozoite is transferred from the salivary glands into the circulatory system of the human. These motile sporozoites are then taken by the circulatory system to the liver, where they invade the liver cells (hepatocytes).

During the next 5–16 days, these sporozoites mature and divide by asexual reproduction into schizonts. Schizonts are structures that contain thousands of haploid merozoites, and rupture to release merozoites into the circulatory system.

These merozoites then infect the red blood cells (erythrocytes) where they consume the hemoglobin of the red blood cells for energy and become immature, ring stage trophozoites. The trophozoites act as an intermediate stage, from which two forms can be formed. The trophozoites can mature into schizonts and release more merozoites into the circulatory system, or they can differentiate into still haploid gametocytes. The gametocyte is the sexual stage of the life cycle, with female macrogametocytes and male microgametocytes.

Sexual reproduction does not occur in the human host. Instead, the gametocytes only fuse to form a diploid zygote when ingested by the female Anopheles. The fertilization takes place in the stomach, where the zygotes can move into the midgut after they differentiate into motile version of the zygote, an ookinetes. Ookinetes then mature into oocytes inside the epithelial tissue of the midgut. Once grown, the oocyte ruptures and releases sporozoites into the salivary glands of the mosquito. The process then repeats itself through the human host if the mosquito lives long enough to infect a human.

== Vectors ==
- Anopheles balabacensis
- Anopheles freeborni
- Anopheles hackeri
- Anopheles maculatus

== Clinical Features ==
When infected with P. coatneyi, the host shows the general symptoms of malaria are fever, headache, chills, vomiting, diarrhea, jaundice, joint pain and anemia. These symptoms occur in the form of paroxysmal attacks, which is a sudden increase of these symptoms after a period of remission. This is due to the release of merozoites from schizonts inside the red blood cells. This cycle occurs every other day when infected with P. coatneyi, a tertiary periodicity. This is compared to the quartan periodicity shown in some other Plasmodium species, such as P. knowlesi which occurs every three days.

Infection causes metabolic disturbances. Davis et al 1993 experimented with rhesus macaques and produced increased glucose and lactate correlated with increased parasitemia. They believed this also correlated with increased insulin resistance and lactate acidosis.

P. coatneyi, unlike many other species in the genus Plasmodium, is a cause of cerebral malaria. The symptoms of this severe form of malaria include impaired consciousness such as a coma, seizures, brain swelling, intracranial hypertension, and other neurological abnormalities. While the exact mechanism for cerebral malaria is not known, the most commonly used explanation is the sequestration of the protozoan infected erythrocytes in the microvasculature of the brain. Due to the fact that it is a species of Plasmodium which only causes malaria in nonhuman primates, no treatment for this form of malaria has been specifically adapted. However, treatment with subcurative levels of artemether has been shown to reduce symptoms. This used to treat P. falciparum, and is grouped into artemisinin-based combination therapies used most for P. falciparum treatment.

== Use as a Model Organism ==
While more closely related to Plasmodium vivax than to P. falciparum, P. coatneyi has been used as a model organism for P. falciparum in a model organism for humans, rhesus macaques. This is due to the several similarities that P. coatneyi and P. falciparum have in common. These similarities includes having a tertiary periodicity, causing cerebral malaria, causing knob protrusion on the surface of infected red blood cells, and adhering the red blood cells to the same sites of the endothelium. Because of these similarities, experiments have been run to further research the mechanism(s) for cerebral malaria.

On a broader scale, P. coatneyi can cause metabolic dysfunction, coagulopathy, and anemia very close to that found in humans. Therefore, P.coatneyi was predicted to be able to test pathophysiological interactions between the parasite and its host. This can be used to mimic the conditions of a human with malaria, allowing for testing without any sort of human exposure taking place.
