= Plasmodium billbrayi =

Scientific classification
- Domain: Eukaryota
- Clade: Sar
- Clade: Alveolata
- Phylum: Apicomplexa
- Class: Aconoidasida
- Order: Haemospororida
- Family: Plasmodiidae
- Genus: Plasmodium
- Species: P. billbrayi

Binomial name
- Plasmodium billbrayi Krief et al., 2010

Species of single-celled organism

Plasmodium billbrayi is a parasite of the genus Plasmodium subgenus Laverania.

P. billbrayi is phylogenetically very close to Plasmodium gaboni, with both sharing a recent common ancestor. The parasite is named in honour of the distinguished malariologist "Bill" Robert Stow Bray (1923–2008).

== Taxonomy ==
Plasmodium billbrayi was first described along with Plasmodium billcollinsi by Krief et al. in February 2010, by sequencing the whole Plasmodium mitochondrial genome in chimpanzees.

== Distribution ==
This species is found in East Africa.

== Hosts ==
Plasmodium billbrayi infects common chimpanzees (Pan troglodytes) and Eastern chimpanzees (Pan troglodytes schweinfurthii).

== See also ==
- List of Plasmodium species infecting primates
