= Plasmodium schwetzi =

Scientific classification
- Domain: Eukaryota
- Clade: Sar
- Clade: Alveolata
- Phylum: Apicomplexa
- Class: Aconoidasida
- Order: Haemospororida
- Family: Plasmodiidae
- Genus: Plasmodium
- Species: P. schwetzi

Binomial name
- Plasmodium schwetzi Reichenow, 1920

Species of single-celled organism

Plasmodium schwetzi is a parasite of the genus Plasmodium subgenus Plasmodium.

Like all Plasmodium species P. schwetzi has both vertebrate and insect hosts. The vertebrate hosts for this parasite are mammals.

== Description ==
Plasmodium schwetzi was first described by Reichenow in 1920 in blood apes in Cameroon.

The parasite resembles both Plasmodium vivax and Plasmodium ovale.

== Geographical occurrence ==
This species is found in Cameroon.

== Clinical features and host pathology ==
This species may occasionally infect man.

== Vectors ==
- Anopheles balabacensis balabacensis
