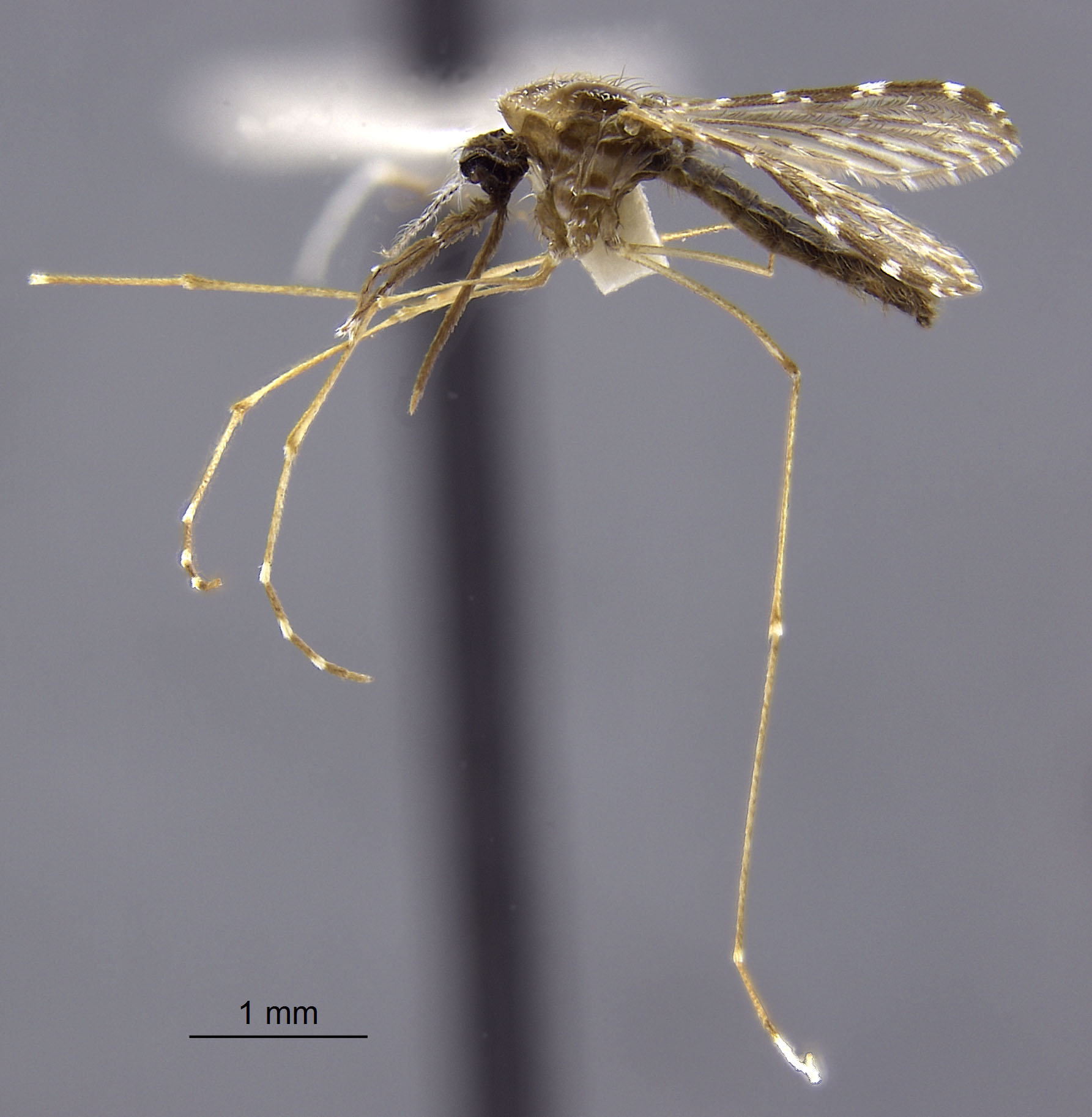
- Preserved specimens of A. annularis

Scientific classification
- Kingdom: Animalia
- Phylum: Arthropoda
- Class: Insecta
- Order: Diptera
- Family: Culicidae
- Genus: Anopheles
- Subgenus: Cellia
- Species: A. annularis

Binomial name
- Anopheles annularis van der Wulp, 1884

= Anopheles annularis =

Species of mosquito

Anopheles annularis is a species of mosquito belonging to the genus Anopheles. Larvae found in clean, lotic bodies of water with abundant vegetation. Females are zoophilic, mainly feed blood on cattle and humans. The species is a major malaria vector in India, Nepal and Sri Lanka. It is also an important vector for Plasmodium vivax in Afghanistan.
