= Plasmodium simium =

Scientific classification
- Domain: Eukaryota
- Supergroup: Alveolata
- Phylum: Apicomplexa
- Class: Aconoidasida
- Order: Haemospororida
- Family: Plasmodiidae
- Genus: Plasmodium
- Species: P. simium

Binomial name
- Plasmodium simium Fonseca, 1951

Species of single-celled organism

Plasmodium simium is a species of apicomplexan parasite that primarily infects New World Monkeys. It was first observed in a howler monkey captured in São Paulo, Brazil. The species is restricted to the Atlantic Forest region in southeastern Brazil, where it is transmitted by the mosquito Anopheles (kerteszia) cruzii, which is the principal vector of both P. simium and Plasmodium vivax. Although long regarded as a monkey-specific parasite, P. simium is now recognized as a zoonotic malaria parasite.

== In humans ==
Molecular investigations showed that an outbreak of locally acquired malaria cases in Rio de Janeiro in 2015 and 2016 were caused by P. simium rather than P. vivax, confirming transmission from non-human primates to humans. More recent evidence suggests that many malaria cases historically attributed to P. vivax in Brazil's Atlantic Forest were likely caused by P. simium, indicating that zoonotic transmission has likely been underestimated.
