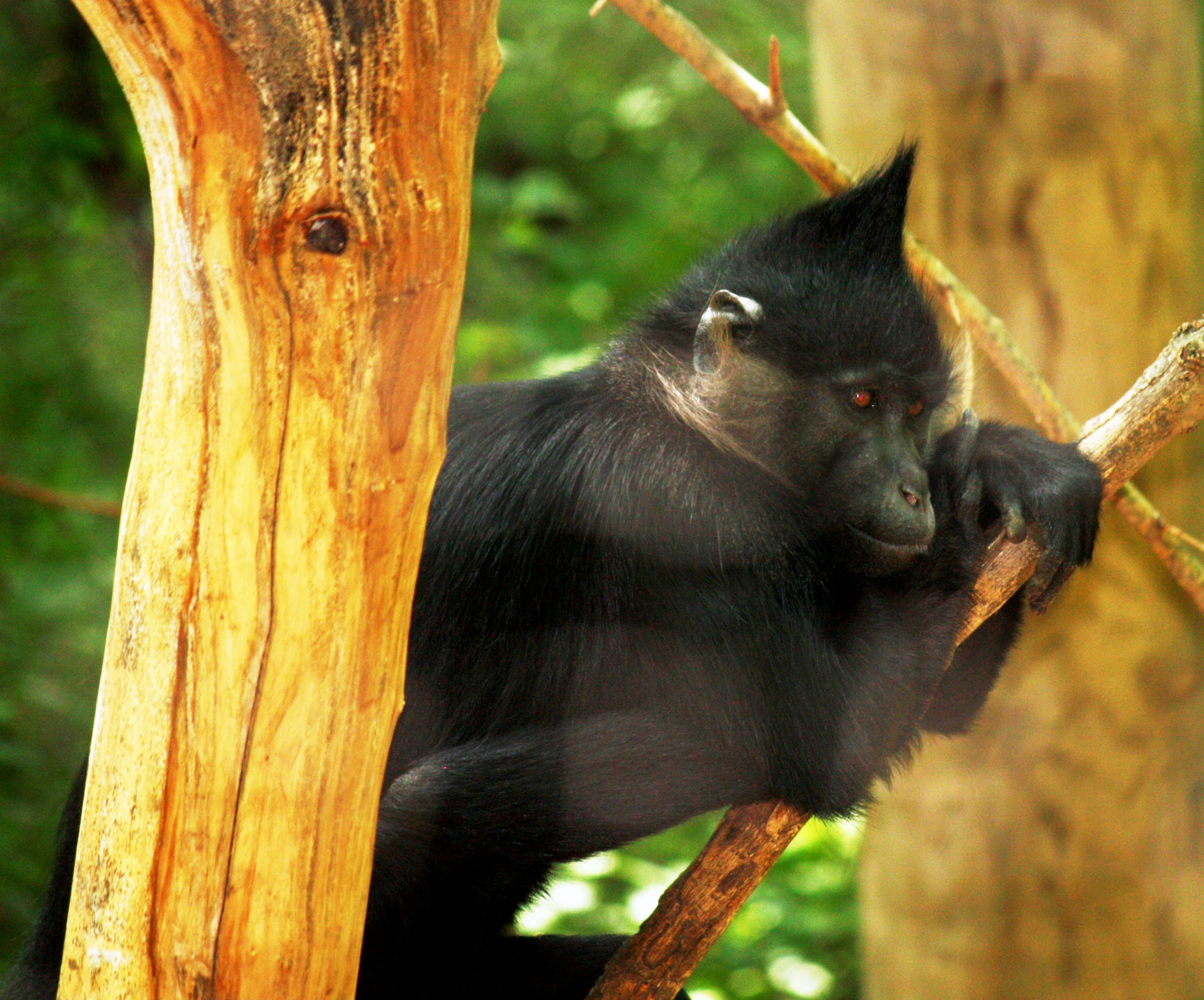
- At Binder Park Zoo, Michigan

Conservation status
- Vulnerable (IUCN 3.1)

Scientific classification
- Kingdom: Animalia
- Phylum: Chordata
- Class: Mammalia
- Infraclass: Placentalia
- Order: Primates
- Family: Cercopithecidae
- Genus: Lophocebus
- Species: L. aterrimus

Binomial name
- Lophocebus aterrimus (Oudemans, 1890)
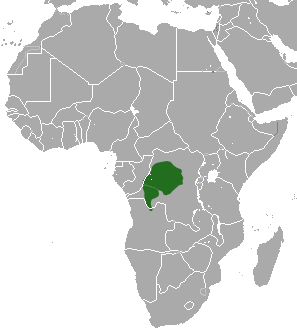
- native range

= Black crested mangabey =

Black-crested mangabey

Species of Old World monkey

The black crested mangabey (Lophocebus aterrimus) is a species of primate in the family Cercopithecidae. It is only found in Democratic Republic of the Congo with a small habitat extending to Angola. Its natural habitat is subtropical or tropical dry forests. It is threatened by habitat loss.
