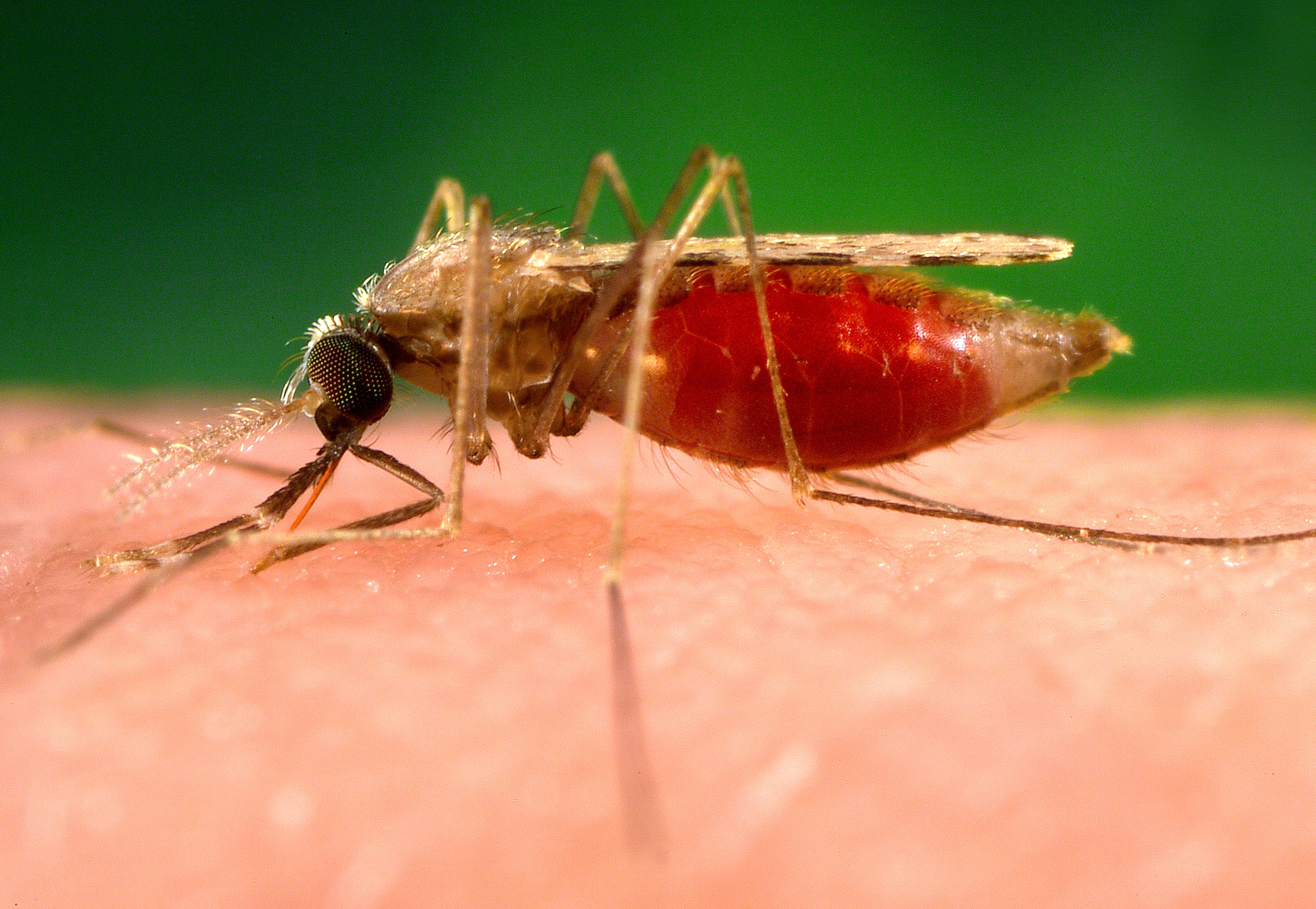

Scientific classification
- Kingdom: Animalia
- Phylum: Arthropoda
- Class: Insecta
- Order: Diptera
- Family: Culicidae
- Genus: Anopheles
- Subgenus: Cellia
- Species: A. minimus

Binomial name
- Anopheles minimus Theobald, 1901

= Anopheles minimus =

Species of mosquito

Anopheles minimus is a species of mosquito can be found around Oriental region included: India, Myanmar, Thailand, Laos, Cambodia, Vietnam, Southern China comprising Hong Kong, Taiwan and the Ryukyu Islands of Japan. It was the main vector of malaria.

== Hosts ==
Hosts include Bos taurus and Bubalus bubalis.
