= Anopheles pattoni =

Scientific classification
- Kingdom: Animalia
- Phylum: Arthropoda
- Class: Insecta
- Order: Diptera
- Family: Culicidae
- Genus: Anopheles
- Subgenus: Cellia
- Species: A. pattoni

Binomial name
- Anopheles pattoni Christophers, 1926

Species of mosquito

Anopheles pattoni is a species of mosquito in the Culicidae family. The scientific name of this species was first published in 1926 by Christophers.
