= Anopheles nigerrimus =

Scientific classification
- Kingdom: Animalia
- Phylum: Arthropoda
- Class: Insecta
- Order: Diptera
- Family: Culicidae
- Genus: Anopheles
- Subgenus: Anopheles
- Species: A. nigerrimus

Binomial name
- Anopheles nigerrimus Giles, 1900

Species complex of mosquito

Anopheles (Anopheles) nigerrimus is a species complex of zoophilic mosquito belonging to the genus Anopheles. It belongs to the Nigerrimus Subgroup and Hyrcanus Group of the Myzorhynchus Series. It is found in India, Sri Lanka, Bangladesh, Brunei, Cambodia, China, Malaysia, Myanmar, Nepal, Pakistan, Thailand, and Vietnam. It is a Possible malaria and filariasis vector. It is found from ecosystems nearby water courses such as rice fields, canals, large open marshes, and also in partially sunny, shady deep pools with floating vegetation. In Sri Lanka, the adult and larval stages are known to show resistant to a range of organophosphate and carbamate insecticides. Cytologically, two karyotypic forms of A. nigerrimus are identified, as Form A and B.
