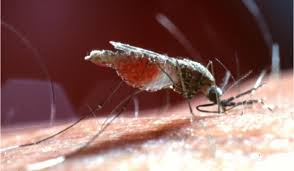
- Anopheles darlingi close up

Scientific classification
- Kingdom: Animalia
- Phylum: Arthropoda
- Class: Insecta
- Order: Diptera
- Family: Culicidae
- Genus: Anopheles
- Subgenus: Anopheles (Nyssorhynchus)
- Species: A. darlingi

Binomial name
- Anopheles darlingi Root, 1926

= Anopheles darlingi =

Species of mosquito

Anopheles darlingi, the American malaria mosquito, is a species of mosquito in the family Culicidae. A. darlingi is one of the major species of mosquito known to be responsible for malaria in the Amazonian regions. It has a wide range of geographic distribution that stretches from Mexico and Argentina, but it has also been found in areas affected by deforestation and environment changes due to humans.

== Breeding ==
The breeding patterns of A. darlingi are affected heavily by the precipitation seen in their environment. Due to the fact that mosquitoes rely on the surfaces of stagnant water or areas with regular flooding as breeding grounds for their eggs and larvae, the annual density of the A. darlingi population is dependent upon the availability of larval habitats. During the wet season, riverine areas are often abundant with mosquitoes and densities are higher in these after the peak of rainfall. Oppositely, in drier inland areas that are usually further from rivers and coexisting with the affects human disturbance, a peak of mosquito density may occasionally occur in the dry season in areas restricted to man-made dams and stagnant puddles.

== Habitat ==
In its native range A. darlingi larvae are found by Manguin et al 1996 and Rozendaal 1992 to inhabit littoral, riverine, and backwater bodies. In its invasive Iquitos range Lounibos and Conn 2000 also find them in aquacultural ponds.

== Range ==
Anopheles darlingi was absent from Iquitos, Peru until shortly after 1991.

== Insecticide resistance ==
Marinotti et al. (2013) provide the first whole genome sequence. This has greatly accelerated understanding of insecticide resistance in A. darlingi. Among other discoveries, Marinotti finds 20 esterases, 30 glutathione S-transferases, and 89 P450s.
