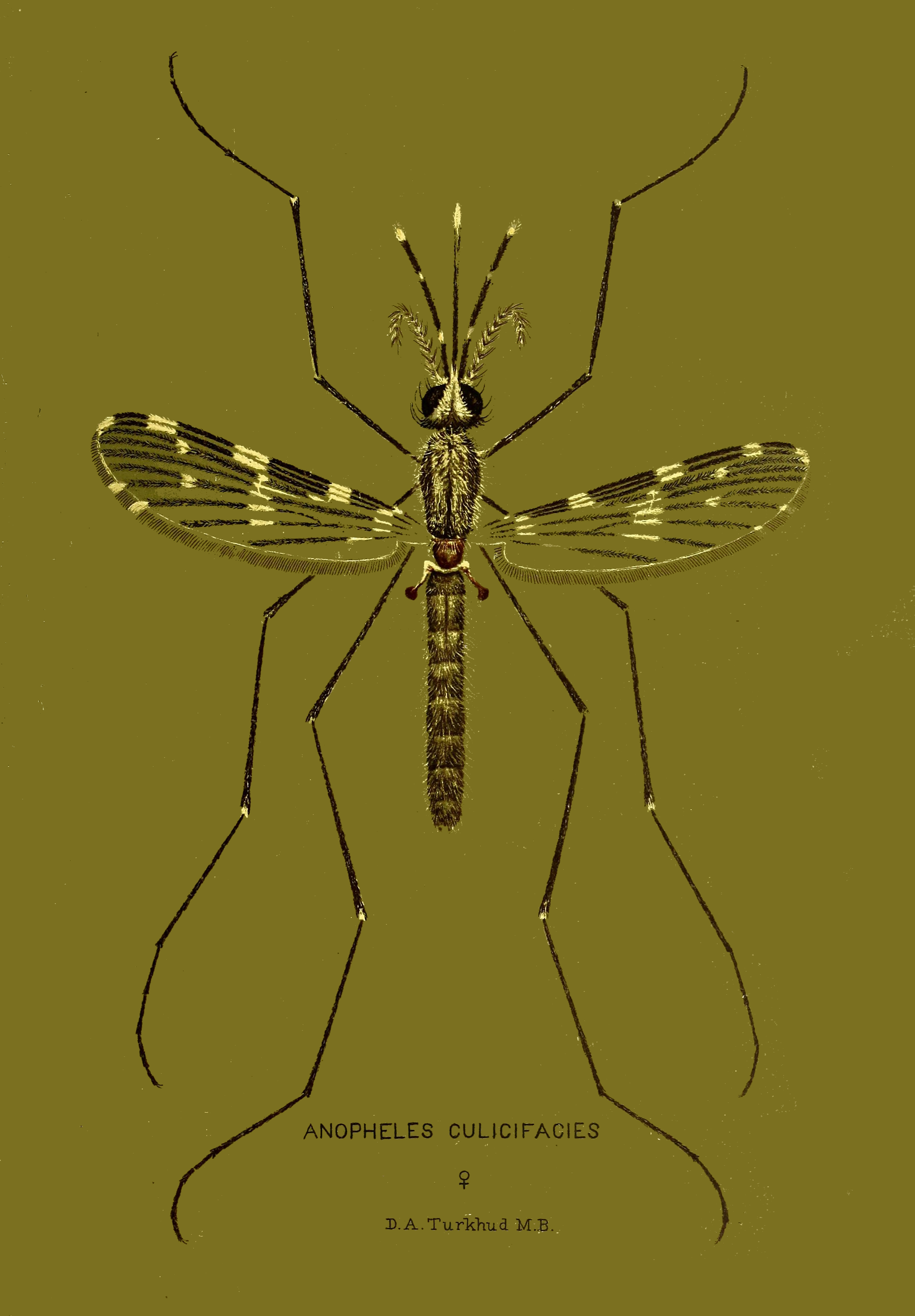

Scientific classification
- Kingdom: Animalia
- Phylum: Arthropoda
- Clade: Pancrustacea
- Class: Insecta
- Order: Diptera
- Family: Culicidae
- Genus: Anopheles
- Subgenus: Cellia
- Species: A. culicifacies

Binomial name
- Anopheles culicifacies Giles, 1901

= Anopheles culicifacies =

Species of mosquito

Anopheles culicifacies is a mosquito species complex and one of the primary vectors of malaria on the Indian subcontinent. It consists of five sibling species, provisionally designated as species A, B, C, D, and E. It prefers to rest indoors in cattle sheds, where it feeds on cattle. The control of A. culicifacies has become difficult due to the development of insecticide resistance against all commonly used insecticides, including new-generation insecticides such as synthetic pyrethroids.

== Phylogeny ==
The Anopheles genus, commonly known as mosquitos comprises almost 500 species, including several species complexes. Taxonomic classification of these mosquitos relies upon traditional morphology, chromosome analysis, and DNA markers. Anopheles is one of the most studied genus of the Culicidae family. As a major vector of diseases such as malaria and filariasis, species belonging to this genus have affected humans more than any other insects.

=== Species complex ===
A species complex is defined as a group of closely related species. Anopheles culicifacies complex consists of five sibling species, designated from A to E, that were identified on the basis of paracentric inversions on polytene chromosome X and 2. These polytene chromosome can be read through analysis of ovarian cells. Through the use of biochemical techniques based on lactate dehydrogenase allozyme (Idh) differentiations can be made for the sibling species. The five sibling species are reproductively isolated and have premating barriers but also have postmating barriers. Crosses between species A and B and A and C produce fertile females and infertile male offspring. The mating of species B and C can produce fertile progeny. All five of the sibling species have different distribution patterns across India, with some regions where they overlap.

== Life stages ==
The species breed near bodies of water during monsoon season Females lay between 50 and 200 eggs on the surface of water bodies per oviposition. These eggs hatch within 2–3 days.

Larvae are born with no legs but well-developed head and mouth for feeding. They also don't have a respiratory siphon, so they must keep their body positioned parallel to the water. They breathe through spiracles located on the 8th abdominal segment.

The pupae are the transitional stage between larvae and adults; at this stage, there is no feeding, only radical morphogenesis. Anopheles species can develop from egg to adult in as little as seven days but usually take 10–14, depending on the environmental conditions.

== Distribution ==
Anopheles culicifacies is found throughout the Indian subcontinent. The species complex is also found to a much smaller extent to the east in Yemen, Iran, Afghanistan, Pakistan, Burma, Thailand, Laos, and Vietnam. also, to the north of India, the species can be found in Nepal and southern China. The species complex is widely distributed in rural and peri-urban India. An. culicifacies is the most widely distributed species of mosquito in India and occurs in all mainland areas, including Kashmir and high-elevation regions of northern India. The An.culicifacies species complex thrives in flat plains that receive fair amounts of rainfall. Populations have been observed at up to 3000m in altitude. The emergence of heavy rainfall, droughts, floods, and varying cold and hot weather in many areas of India, An. culicifacies population has begun to see a change in distribution.

Species B of the An. culicifacies species complex is the most predominant and widespread throughout India. Species A and B are found to be sympartic in north and south India, with predominance of species A in the north and species B in the south. In eastern Uttar Pradesh and northeastern states, species B is seen to be the only species present. In the western and eastern regions, species B and C are predominant. Species D is observed to be sympatric with species A and B in the northwestern region and with species A, B, and C in the central region and a few areas in southern India. Species E is sympatric with species B in southern Tamil Nadu and Sri Lanka. The distribution and proportion of sibling species is subject to change through varying seasons. For example, in Delhi, where species A and B are sympatric, species A is predominant throughout the year, but proportions of species B increased during post-monsoon months.

== As a vector of disease ==
The An. culicifacies species are responsible for 65-75% of malaria cases in India alone. In Madhya Pradesh 8% of the population contribute to 30% of the total malaria cases in central India, due to the large concentration of An. culicifacies species in central India. A study conducted compared two species of mosquitoes An. subpictus and An. culicifacies and found that the An. culicifices species had a higher sporozoite rate of 1.8% as 13 of 716 collected insects were positive for the malaria sporozoite. An. culicifacies are generally zoophilic, meaning they feed on animals, and this species has an affinity for cattle. The species also has a low affinity for human flesh, but due to their high density, they are a major vector for malaria. The species prefers to breed near streams, rice fields, irrigation channels, and rainwater collections. Because of this vast breeding range occupied by this species during monsoon season, it is difficult to employ anti-larval control methods. The sibling species differ in their susceptibility to malaria sporogony; species A is known to be highly susceptible, and it is followed by species C and B. Species B has a unique ability that allows it to kill early sporogony in its midgut through cellular encapsulation. The control of An. culicifacies has been a major concern for vectorial control programs in India due to the evolutions of resistance to commonly used insecticides such as DDT.

=== Resistance ===
During the early use of Dichlorodiphenyltrichloroethane (DDT), it was very effective against populations of An. culicifacies when applied as residual treatment. Due to the over and improper use of DDT An. culicifacies resistance began to emerge in several regions of India. Resistance to DDT led to the use of Hexachlorocyclohexane (HCH) and dieldrin which similarly saw resistance in An. culicifacies. This again led to using another insecticide called malathion, and similarly, resistance evolved. As resistance merged, large outbreaks began to occur. Today, in most parts of India An. culicifacies is resistant to DDT and HCH, and in some states, like Gujarat and Orissa, they are also resistant to malathion and most commonly used insecticides.
