= Anopheles introlatus =

Scientific classification
- Kingdom: Animalia
- Phylum: Arthropoda
- Class: Insecta
- Order: Diptera
- Family: Culicidae
- Genus: Anopheles
- Subgenus: Cellia
- Species: A. introlatus

Binomial name
- Anopheles introlatus Colless, 1957

Species of mosquito

Anopheles introlatus (formerly Anopheles balabacensis introlatus) is the main vector for Plasmodium cynomolgi (a simian malaria) in Malaya.
