= Anopheles tessellatus =

Scientific classification
- Kingdom: Animalia
- Phylum: Arthropoda
- Class: Insecta
- Order: Diptera
- Family: Culicidae
- Genus: Anopheles
- Subgenus: Cellia
- Species: A. tessellatus

Binomial name
- Anopheles tessellatus Theobald, 1901

Synonyms
- Anopheles ceylonica Newstead and Carter, 1910; Anopheles deceptor Doenitz, 1902; Anopheles formosae Hatori, 1901; Anopheles kinoshitai Koidzumi, 1917; Anopheles taiwanensis Koidzumi, 1917; Anopheles thorntoni Ludlow, 1904

Species of mosquito

Anopheles (Cellia) tessellatus is a species complex of zoophilic mosquito belonging to the genus Anopheles. It is found in India, and Sri Lanka, Bangladesh, Cambodia, China, Indonesia, Malaysia, Laos, Maldives, Myanmar, Nepal, Philippines, Taiwan, Thailand and Vietnam. It is first described from Sri Lanka (then Ceylon). Larvae are known to found from dirty stagnant water in sun or shady habitats. Adults are zoophilic. It is not regarded as a malaria vector, but is a secondary vector of Wuchereria bancrofti in Maldives.
