= Anopheles nili =

Scientific classification
- Kingdom: Animalia
- Phylum: Arthropoda
- Clade: Pancrustacea
- Class: Insecta
- Order: Diptera
- Family: Culicidae
- Genus: Anopheles
- Subgenus: Cellia
- Species: A. nili

Binomial name
- Anopheles nili Theobald, 1904

Species of mosquito

Anopheles nili is a species of mosquito in the Culicidae family. It comprises the following elements: An. carnevalei, An. nili, An. ovengensis and An. somalicus. The scientific name of this species was first published in 1904 by Theobald. It is the main mosquito species found in the south Cameroon forest zone which bites humans. It is known as a problematic carrier of malaria, although newly discovered, closely related species in the same genus have also been found to interact with A. nili as a disease vector. In that, they both have similar feeding habits on local targets in the Cameroon region.

== Life cycle ==
For more information, see mosquito life cycle.

Similar to all mosquitoes, Anopheles nili go through a life stages of egg, larva, pupa, then emerge as adults.

Anopheles nili is a generalist species, meaning that they may adapt to different environments to survive. This has worked to the detriment of human health, as the mosquito species has become very well adapted to spawning in dam reservoirs. As A. nili shifts its habitats to areas of high human concentration, they also begin to mate and spawn their young in nearby reservoirs, such as dams. This of course allows spread of malaria to the nearby populace.

== As malaria carriers ==
Mosquitoes are well known carriers of malaria, A. nili being without exception. As a native species that has adapted to live with the environmental changes of Cameroon it marks itself as a common species found to be carrying malarial parasites in the newly built dams of Cameroon.

Dam development in Cameroon marks itself as a grave detriment to native populations health, through the spread of malaria. Dam developments in particular, because mass environmental changes alter the balance of disease hosts, vectors, and parasite development. Studies have been made in recent history before and after dams are built in Cameroon to better understand the method in how malaria is transmitted. It was found in studies dating back as long as1979, where native mosquitoes, like A. nili, favoured dams as breeding grounds; and thus ripe for malaria breakouts. It was also found in those researches that the malarial parasites are found in the midgut of mosquitoes, that being an example of the parasites persistence.
