= Anopheles moucheti =

Scientific classification
- Kingdom: Animalia
- Phylum: Arthropoda
- Clade: Pancrustacea
- Class: Insecta
- Order: Diptera
- Family: Culicidae
- Genus: Anopheles
- Subgenus: Cellia
- Species: A. moucheti

Binomial name
- Anopheles moucheti Evan, 1923

Species of mosquito

Anopheles moucheti is a species of mosquito. It is an anthropophile. It can be mainly located in Congo Basin forest, Central Africa. It is the main vector of malaria.
