= Anopheles kleini =

Scientific classification
- Kingdom: Animalia
- Phylum: Arthropoda
- Class: Insecta
- Order: Diptera
- Family: Culicidae
- Genus: Anopheles
- Subgenus: Anopheles
- Species: A. kleini

Binomial name
- Anopheles kleini Rueda, 2005

Species of mosquito

Anopheles kleini is a species of mosquito. It is found in South Korea. The species name honors US Army Colonel Terry A. Klein, medical entomologist, for his numerous contributions to mosquito research in Asia.
