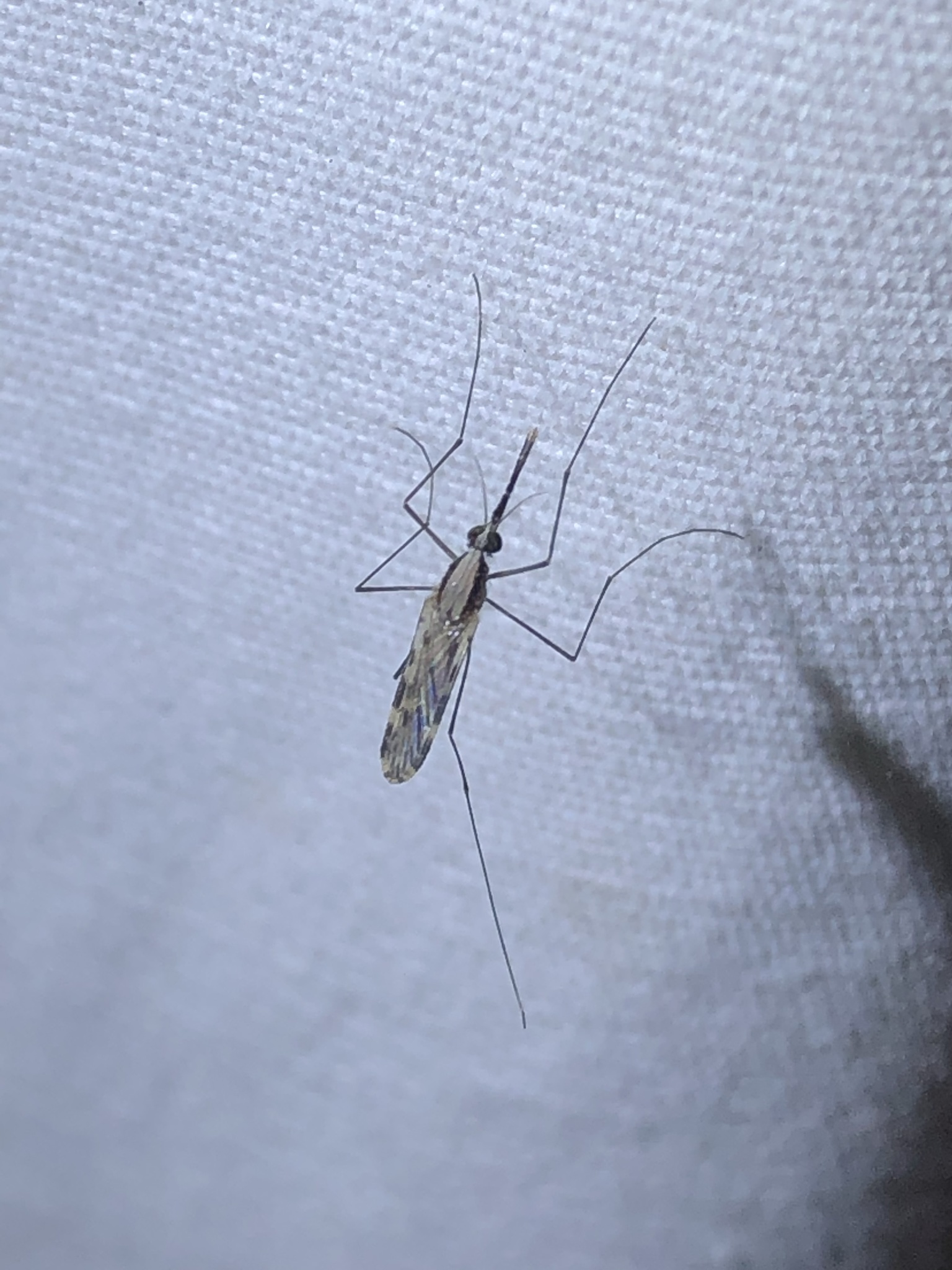

Scientific classification
- Kingdom: Animalia
- Phylum: Arthropoda
- Clade: Pancrustacea
- Class: Insecta
- Order: Diptera
- Family: Culicidae
- Genus: Anopheles
- Subgenus: Anopheles
- Species: A. pseudopunctipennis

Binomial name
- Anopheles pseudopunctipennis Theobald, 1901

= Anopheles pseudopunctipennis =

Species of mosquito

Anopheles pseudopunctipennis is a species of mosquito belonging to the Anopheles genus.

== Distribution ==
This species is widely distributed across the Americas, from the southern United States to northern Argentina, including the Andes and the Lesser Antilles. It is particularly prevalent in foothills and valleys of mountainous regions, where it thrives in arid environments.

The larvae of An. pseudopunctipennis are found in sunlit freshwater pools, often located in dry, arid valleys or foothills. These pools typically contain clear, shallow water with abundant filamentous green algae, which serve as a primary habitat for immature stages. The species is most active during the dry season when such breeding sites are more common.

== Medical importance ==
As a major malaria vector in the Americas, An. pseudopunctipennis is responsible for transmitting Plasmodium vivax and other malaria-causing protozoans to humans. It plays a particularly critical role in malaria transmission during the dry season when other mosquito species may be less active.

Studies have shown that reducing filamentous algae in breeding sites can significantly lower larval densities and adult populations of An. pseudopunctipennis. Such interventions are important for controlling malaria transmission in endemic areas.
