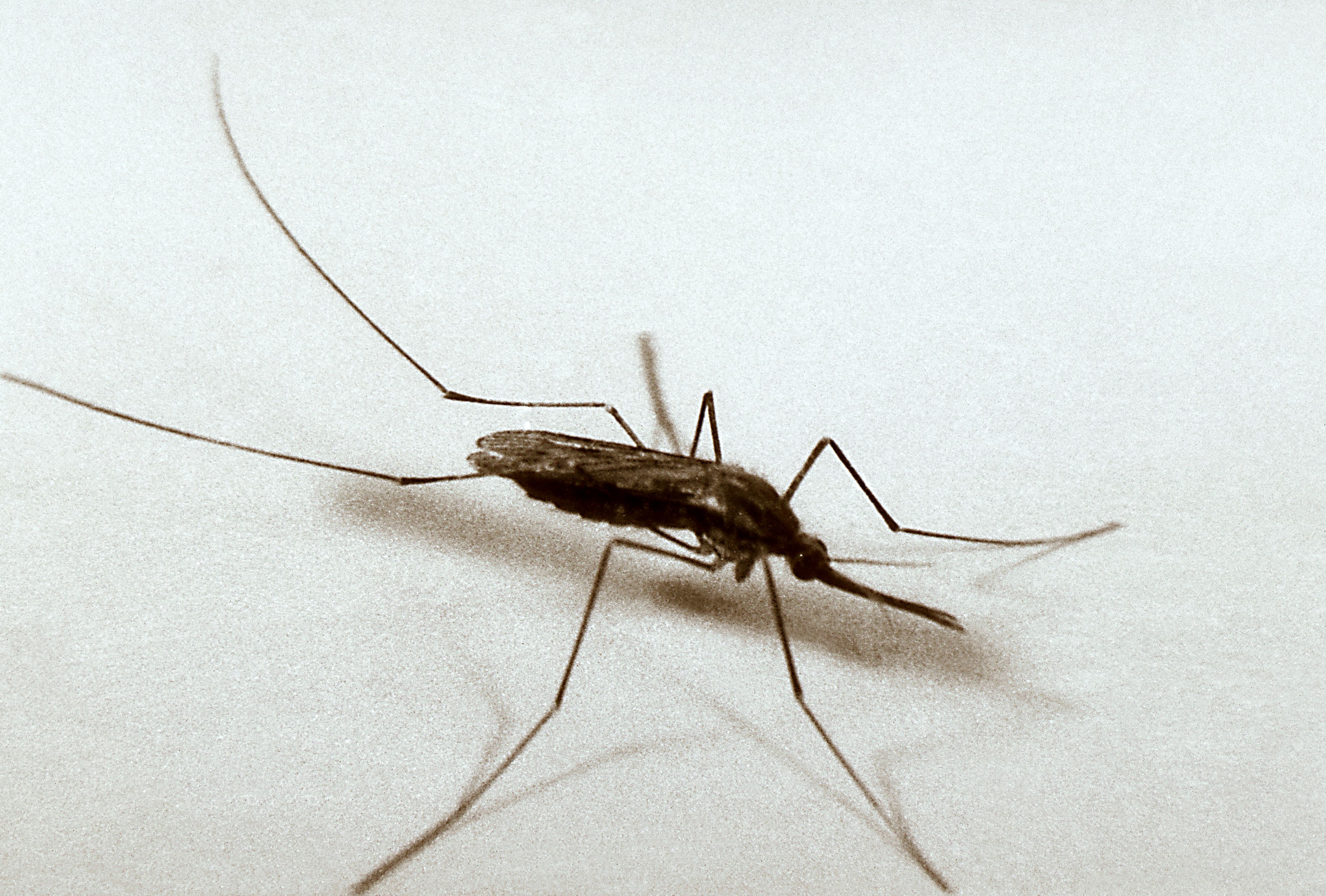

Scientific classification
- Kingdom: Animalia
- Phylum: Arthropoda
- Class: Insecta
- Order: Diptera
- Family: Culicidae
- Genus: Anopheles
- Subgenus: Anopheles
- Species: A. quadrimaculatus

Binomial name
- Anopheles quadrimaculatus Say, 1824

= Anopheles quadrimaculatus =

Species of mosquito

Anopheles quadrimaculatus, also known as the common malaria mosquito, is a species of mosquito mainly found in the eastern United States. The species is a main vector of malaria.

== Distribution ==
The common malaria mosquito is common across the southeastern United States, especially along the coast of the Gulf of Mexico.

== Life cycle ==
Mosquitoes lay their eggs on still bodies of freshwater, where they float on the surface. Larvae take 2 to 3 days to hatch; these larvae lack breathing siphons, and so they rest parallel to the surface to breathe. The larvae take between 5 days and 2 weeks to mature depending on the environmental conditions. Adult mosquitoes typically live for approximately 2 weeks.
