= Anopheles peditaeniatus =

Scientific classification
- Kingdom: Animalia
- Phylum: Arthropoda
- Class: Insecta
- Order: Diptera
- Family: Culicidae
- Genus: Anopheles
- Subgenus: Anopheles
- Species: A. peditaeniatus

Binomial name
- Anopheles peditaeniatus Leicester, 1908

Species complex of mosquito

Anopheles (Anopheles) peditaeniatus is a species complex of mosquito belonging to the genus Anopheles, of the Hyrcanus Group. It is found in India, and Sri Lanka, Iran, and Bangladesh. It is a potential natural vector of bancroftian filariasis in Sri Lanka.
