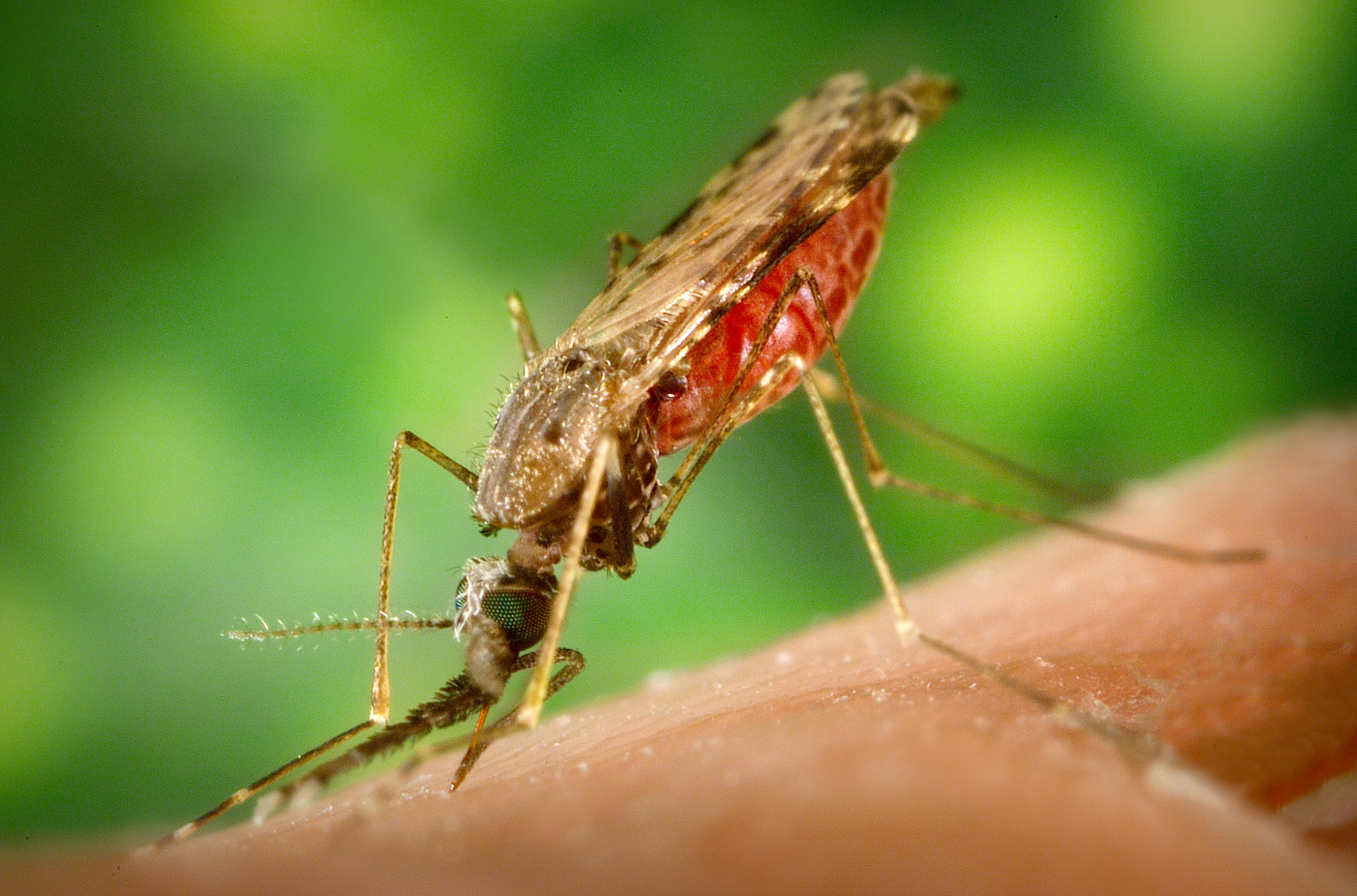
- Female Anopheles albimanus

Scientific classification
- Kingdom: Animalia
- Phylum: Arthropoda
- Clade: Pancrustacea
- Class: Insecta
- Order: Diptera
- Family: Culicidae
- Genus: Anopheles
- Subgenus: Nyssorhynchus
- Species: A. albimanus

Binomial name
- Anopheles albimanus C. R. G. Wiedemann, 1820

= Anopheles albimanus =

Species of mosquito

Anopheles albimanus is a species of mosquito in the order Diptera. It is found in coastal Central and South America, the Caribbean, and Mexico. It is a generalist species and capable of wide dispersion. A. albimanus is a common malaria vector.

== Anatomy ==
Mosquitoes have long legs and one pair of wings. Females have piercing, sucking mouthparts to penetrate hosts. Males have a proboscis as well, but are unable to pierce. The vibration of membranes on the thorax creates the distinguishable whining sound.

== Taxonomy and evolution ==
Anopheles albimanus appears to be a single species that shows polymorphism. It is believed that this species originated in the Caribbean, and first moved to Central America, then South America. Studies suggest that the occurrence of the founder effect is the cause of the current population structure. Research using mitochondrial DNA found some modest differences between Central and South American populations. It has been hypothesized that this could be due to recent pressures, such as the distance between populations, high insecticide use, or mountain ranges that act as gene flow barriers. Overall, differences in populations were found to be relatively low. Studies suggest that this is due to these mosquitoes showing excellent dispersal abilities, opportunistic feeding, and niche plasticity. As well, other species in the genus Anopheles are specialists with small populations, specific habitat requirements, and limited dispersal and distribution methods. Alternately, A. albimanus is a generalist species. Females can fly up to 32 kilometres, and specimens have been found at almost 2000 meters altitude, meaning that mountain ranges would not separate these populations as easily as other Anopheles mosquitoes. The conclusions drawn from this research were that the differences found between A. albimanus populations were not due to recent events, but rather, Pleistocene divergence followed by re-colonization and expansion.

== Distribution and behavior ==
These mosquitoes are currently found in Mexico, and several countries in the Caribbean, Central America, and South America. They are usually present in coastal areas, at 500 meters altitude or lower; however, some have been found above 1000 meters. This species occurs in a variety of habitats in these coastal areas, with regional differences in precipitation, temperature, and vegetation. This is the most common species found in countries like Colombia.

Anopheles albimanus are seasonally abundant mosquitoes that are primarily active at dawn and dusk (crepuscular), prefer to feed outdoors (exophagic), and tend to live outside (exophilic). Seasonal abundance is dependent on the availability of larval habitats. In areas that have great differences in rainfall depending on the time of year, these mosquitoes are most abundant in the rainy season. In areas that have wetlands that stay flooded permanently, they are found year-round. Although these are the typical traits seen, factors such as host availability and control methods can change the population characteristics.

== Feeding by adults ==
Anopheles albimanus mosquitoes feed on nectar; only females take blood meals. Hosts include mammals, birds, reptiles, and amphibians. A wide range of hosts allows these mosquitoes to maintain their populations quite easily. The proteins and nutrients gained from blood go toward egg production, and the volume of the blood meals affects the fecundity of female mosquitoes. The volume taken during blood feeding is affected by several factors, including temperature, age of the mosquito, mating status, number of feeds, variety of hosts, and others. There are often interruptions to blood feeding, resulting in the mosquito taking several meals, either on the same or different hosts. This, in turn, creates more opportunities for infection or the spread of pathogens.

== Life cycle ==
These mosquitoes undergo holometabolous development, meaning that their life cycle includes egg, larva, pupa, and adult stages. There are four larval instars in A. albimanus. The number and maturation success of eggs oviposited depends on the quality and quantity of blood taken by the female. Eggs can be laid one by one, or glued together in a mass. The habitats that females choose to oviposit in will affect the distribution of larvae. If a habitat is seeing an absence of larvae, this may be due to females being selective for locations with richer food sources or protection from predation. It could also be because of environmental conditions that would kill the eggs or larvae.

A. albimanus larvae are able to develop in a wide range of habitats and conditions (i.e. salinity, pollution). During the wet season in Central America, larvae are found in rivers, marshes, irrigation canals, and several other water habitats, both permanent and temporary. During the dry season, they are found only in permanent water habitats. There is a relationship between the presence of A. albimanus larvae and cyanobacteria mats floating on the water. This is because the presence of blue-green algae results in an elevated minimum water temperature and less dissolved oxygen. Volatile compounds released from the algae attract females, increasing the likelihood of oviposition. There is less known about South American populations, but larvae have been found in rice fields and drains. In Colombia, larvae are found in sunny habitats, where temperatures are 27 to 30 degrees Celsius. Understanding larval habitats and distribution are important in developing control methods for these mosquitoes.

== Disease ==
Anopheles albimanus is a medically important species, as it is a key Plasmodium vivax malaria vector; this means that they carry and transmit an organism that causes a disease in another host organism, and usually are not harmed themselves. In countries such as Belize, they are considered a secondary vector because they prefer not to enter human homes, and rather, feed on domestic animals. However, in other areas where domestic animals are not abundant, and especially regions where indigenous people live, malaria is endemic. This is due to large populations of the mosquitoes, as well as poorly built houses. Females acquire P. vivax during a blood meal from an infected host. The parasite moves to the midgut and reproduces sexually. The parasite and the blood itself interact with the lining of the midgut, eliciting stress and digestion responses in the mosquito, as well as immune reactions. The parasite must survive these responses in order for the egg to fertilize and form an ookinete. The ookinetes then move into the epithelial lining of the midgut to multiply further, resulting in sporozoites. These sporozoites travel to the salivary glands, and can then be spread to a new host when a blood meal is taken. These changes in the midgut evolved to cope with the invasion of microorganisms, free radical formation, and digestion of the blood meal.

== Control ==
Colonies of Anopheles mosquitoes are maintained for several areas of research, such as malaria vector ability, transmission of pathogens, the effectiveness of insecticides, resistance to insecticides, and vaccine research. By studying these topics, more insight may be gained to increase the understanding of malaria, as well as the effects that control measures would have on the reduction of both the vectors and the spread of the disease.
