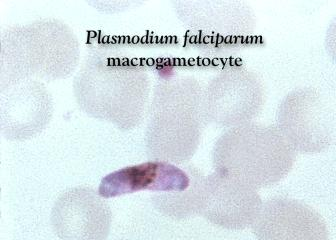
- Macrogametocyte of Plasmodium falciparum

Scientific classification
- Domain: Eukaryota
- Clade: Sar
- Clade: Alveolata
- Phylum: Apicomplexa
- Class: Aconoidasida
- Order: Haemospororida
- Family: Plasmodiidae
- Genus: Plasmodium
- Subgenus: Laverania; Bray, 1958

Species
- See text

= Laverania =

Subgenus of single-celled organisms

Laverania is a subgenus of the parasite genus Plasmodium. Infection with these species results in malaria. The subgenus was first described in 1958.

The name was first proposed by Welch in 1897 as a genus name for the group now known as Plasmodium but for a variety of reasons the genus name Plasmodium was preferred.

== Taxonomy ==
The first non-human primate parasites were described by Eduard Reichenow in Cameroon in 1920. He observed three morphologically distinct Plasmodium parasites in the blood of chimpanzees and gorillas in 1917. These finding were later confirmed by other workers. One species closely resembled P. falciparum and was thought to be the same species. This species was later renamed P. reichenowi.

The other two species — P. rhodaini and P. schwetzi — have since been placed in the subgenus Plasmodium.

The noticeable differences between P. falciparum and the other known Plasmodium species led to the proposal that it be placed in a separate genus Laverania. This suggestion was not accepted but the proposed name is now used as the subgenus.

=== Species ===
It has been proposed to rename P. gora and P. gorb as Plasmodium adleri and Plasmodium blacklocki respectively. It has also been proposed that P. billbrayi be considered a junior synonym of P. gaboni.

- Plasmodium billcollinsi
- Plasmodium billbrayi
- Plasmodium falciparum
- Plasmodium gaboni
- Plasmodium gora
- Plasmodium gorb
- 'Plasmodium lomamiensis
- Plasmodium reichenowi

The full genomes of the seven species are now sequenced and available on PlasmoDB.
