= Parasitemia =

- Specialty: Infectious disease

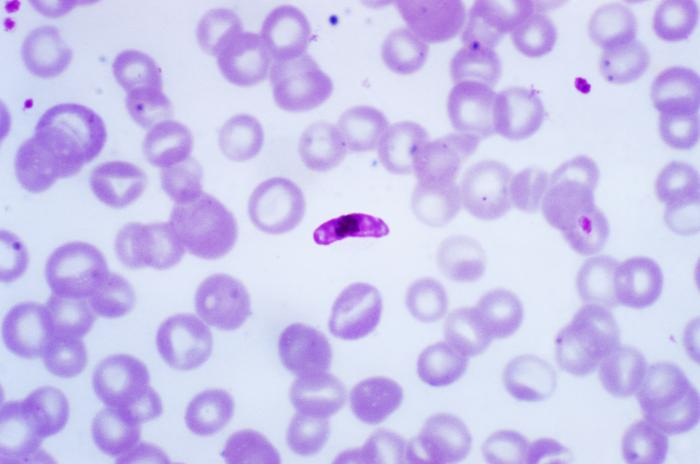
A photomicrograph of a blood smear containing a macrogametocyte of the parasite Plasmodium falciparum

Parasitemia is the quantitative content of parasites in the blood. It is used as a measurement of parasite load in the organism and an indication of the degree of an active parasitic infection. Systematic measurement of parasitemia is important in many phases of the assessment of disease, such as in diagnosis and in the follow-up of therapy, particularly in the chronic phase, when cure depends on ascertaining a parasitemia of zero.

The methods to be used for quantifying parasitemia depends on the parasitic species and its life cycle. For instance, in malaria, the number of blood-stage parasites can be counted using an optical microscope, on a special thick film (for low parasitemias) or thin film blood smear (for high parasitemias).

The use of molecular biology techniques, such as PCR has been used increasingly as a tool to measure parasitemia, especially in patients in the chronic phase of disease. In this technique, blood samples are obtained from the patient, and specific DNA of the parasite is extracted and amplified by PCR.
