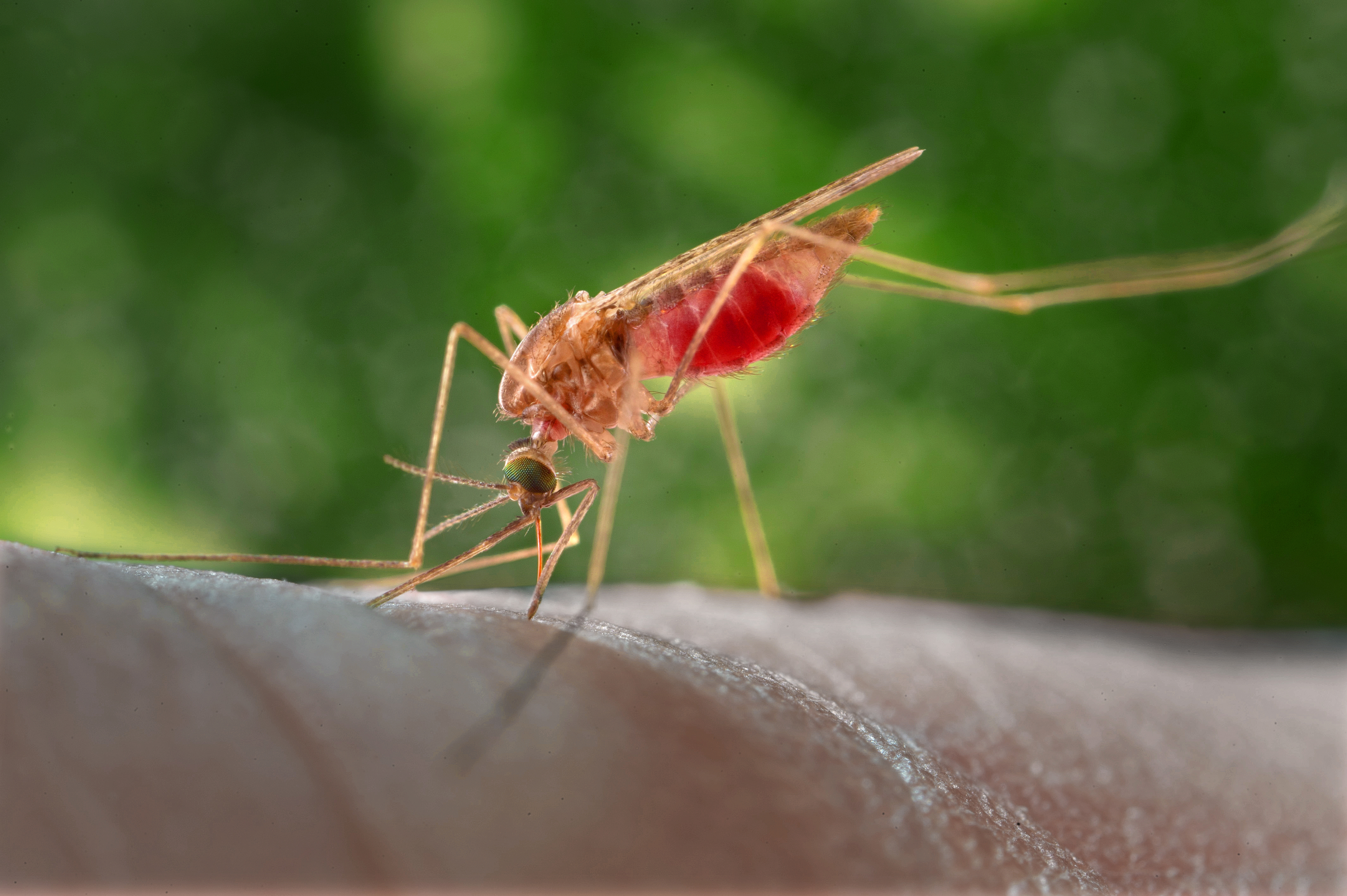

Scientific classification
- Kingdom: Animalia
- Phylum: Arthropoda
- Clade: Pancrustacea
- Class: Insecta
- Order: Diptera
- Family: Culicidae
- Genus: Anopheles
- Subgenus: Anopheles
- Species: A. atroparvus

Binomial name
- Anopheles atroparvus Van Thiel, 1927

= Anopheles atroparvus =

Palearctic mosquito species

Anopheles atroparvus is a European species of mosquito, which was first identified in 1927. It is one of the most abundant palearctic Anopheles species belonging to the family Culicidae, commonly called mosquitoes. Although research interest in A. atroparvus has been low in the past several decades, recent concern for an increase in vector-borne disease has encouraged new research into this species.

Anopheles atroparvus underwent population reduction in many areas where it was once abundant due to pollution of natural habitats, vector control measures, and the reduction of suitable habitat through drying or flooding. It is the natural prey to many fish and insect species, and preys upon mainly humans, birds and livestock associated with farmland and farm dwellings.

== Taxonomy ==
Anopheles atroparvus belongs to the subgenre Anopheles among a group defined by the maculipennis complex Differentiation between Anopheles species is often not possible at a phenotypic level but instead is observed in behavior, such as differences in habitats or hibernation habits, or variation at a genetic level.

== Distribution and habitat ==
=== Distribution ===
Vastly distributed throughout most of Europe, specifically northern regions, with little or no known populations in Southern and South eastern Europe. A. atroparvus is currently assumed not to live in Italy, Greece or Turkey. Distribution of A. atroparvus is affected in some areas due to competition with related species. Other constraints on distribution depends on habitat suitability; A. atroparvus is limited by the need for water and vegetation to reproduce and minimize the risk of predation. Because A. atroparvus tends to like warmer climate, global climate change could result in changing habitat distribution for A. atroparvus and it is generally considered to result in an increase in population density of the species.

=== Habitat ===
Anopheles atroparvus is common to both coastal and inland areas where short lived still water bodies are plentiful. Adults live in close association with the animal and human blood hosts that it feeds on and tend to live in farm homes and other dwellings. Suitable habitat for larval stages is mainly in wide, shallow non-permanent water bodies of brackish water, commonly in association with irrigated fields especially crops such as rice. Unlike many other species, A. atroparvus remains active in the winter months, at which time it will still take blood meals, but will not lay eggs. Their activity in the winter may result in an annual reduction in population as competition for food and shelter rises. A. atroparvus displays genetic diversity for protection against common insecticides used on crops, making it easier for them to live on farmland.

== Life cycle ==
Adult A. atroparvus can be active feeders all year round, but cannot lay eggs in the winter and tend to dwell inside through the winter months. They are most active during the summer months (June-July). During the warmer months, eggs are laid in suitable water bodies, where they will hatch and larva will remain in the water until they develop into adults. Females have been recorded to have a short life span.

Larval stages require water for development and it is not until they become adults that they can survive a non-aquatic environment. This species shows some adaptability when recent observations have recorded larvae present in small water bodies within towns such as overgrown roadsides, which were not considered suitable in the past.

== Parasitology ==
Anopheles atroparvus is a well known historical vector for malaria (Plasmodium spp) particularly throughout Europe and the UK, and is considered the main vector for malaria in many countries such as Romania, Portugal, France and the Netherlands. In Spain, A. atroparvus has been identified as the main vector for two different malaria parasites (Plasmodium vivax & Plasmodium falciparum). Although malaria has been considered absent of natural strains in Europe, changing climate and human caused land conditioning via agriculture or environmental protection measures could cause an increase in population of A. atroparvus in areas where it used to be a main vector for the disease. Because A. atroparvus is still active in the winter and tend to live in dwellings with their blood meals, this can result in multiple infections in the same household.

=== Control ===
In the past, measures such as introducing fish and insect species that prey on A. atroparvus to water bodies has been used to decrease the presence of the malaria vector. Household measures were also introduced and effectively reduced malaria contraction via reduction in A. atroparvus populations. this included indoor DDT insecticide sprays and bug nets for windows and doors. Through both intentional control of A. atroparvus and other factors such as pollution to A. atroparvus breeding grounds in the Netherlands, the decrease of this vector species led to the elimination of malaria from Europe. although primarily research suggests that climate change would serve to increase A. atroparvus populations, there are also implications that it may instead adversely affect populations by reducing water bodies and rainfall that are required for reproduction. There is also concern over vector control as A. atroparvus could become infected with Plasmodium species that have been imported from areas where malaria is more abundant.
