= Anopheles vagus =

Scientific classification
- Kingdom: Animalia
- Phylum: Arthropoda
- Class: Insecta
- Order: Diptera
- Family: Culicidae
- Genus: Anopheles
- Subgenus: Cellia
- Species: A. vagus

Binomial name
- Anopheles vagus Dönitz, 1902

Species of mosquito

Anopheles (Cellia) vagus is a species complex of zoophilic mosquito belonging to the genus Anopheles. It is found in India, Sri Lanka and Indonesia. It is a potential natural vector of malarial parasite Plasmodium falciparum, and Japanese encephalitis virus. It is highly susceptible to insecticide deltamethrin and resistant to DDT.
