= Anopheles sundaicus =

Scientific classification
- Kingdom: Animalia
- Phylum: Arthropoda
- Class: Insecta
- Order: Diptera
- Family: Culicidae
- Genus: Anopheles
- Subgenus: Cellia
- Species: A. sundaicus

Binomial name
- Anopheles sundaicus (Rodenwaldt, 1948)

South east Asian mosquito

Anopheles sundaicus is a zoophilic mosquito of southeast Asia.

== Species complex ==
Sukowati et al. 1999 finds there to be several cryptic species in an An. sundaicus complex. They use protein electrophoresis to reveal populations defined by their characteristic allozymes.

== Hosts ==
Hosts include Bubalus bubalis. Kumari et al. 1993 finds An. sundaicus exclusively feeding on B. bubalis on Car Nicobar Island, Moorhouse and Wharton 1965 finds the same in Malaysia and Gould et al. 1966 in Thailand.

== Control ==
=== Insecticide ===
Sargassum wightii and Bacillus thuringiensis var. israelensis can be combined to produce antifeedant, insecticidal and growth inhibitor effects.

==== Insecticide resistance ====
Early studies of the inheritance of insecticide resistance were performed by Davidson 1957 and Soerono et al. 1965. Davidson 1957 found An. sundaicus DDT resistance was provided by only a single allele.
