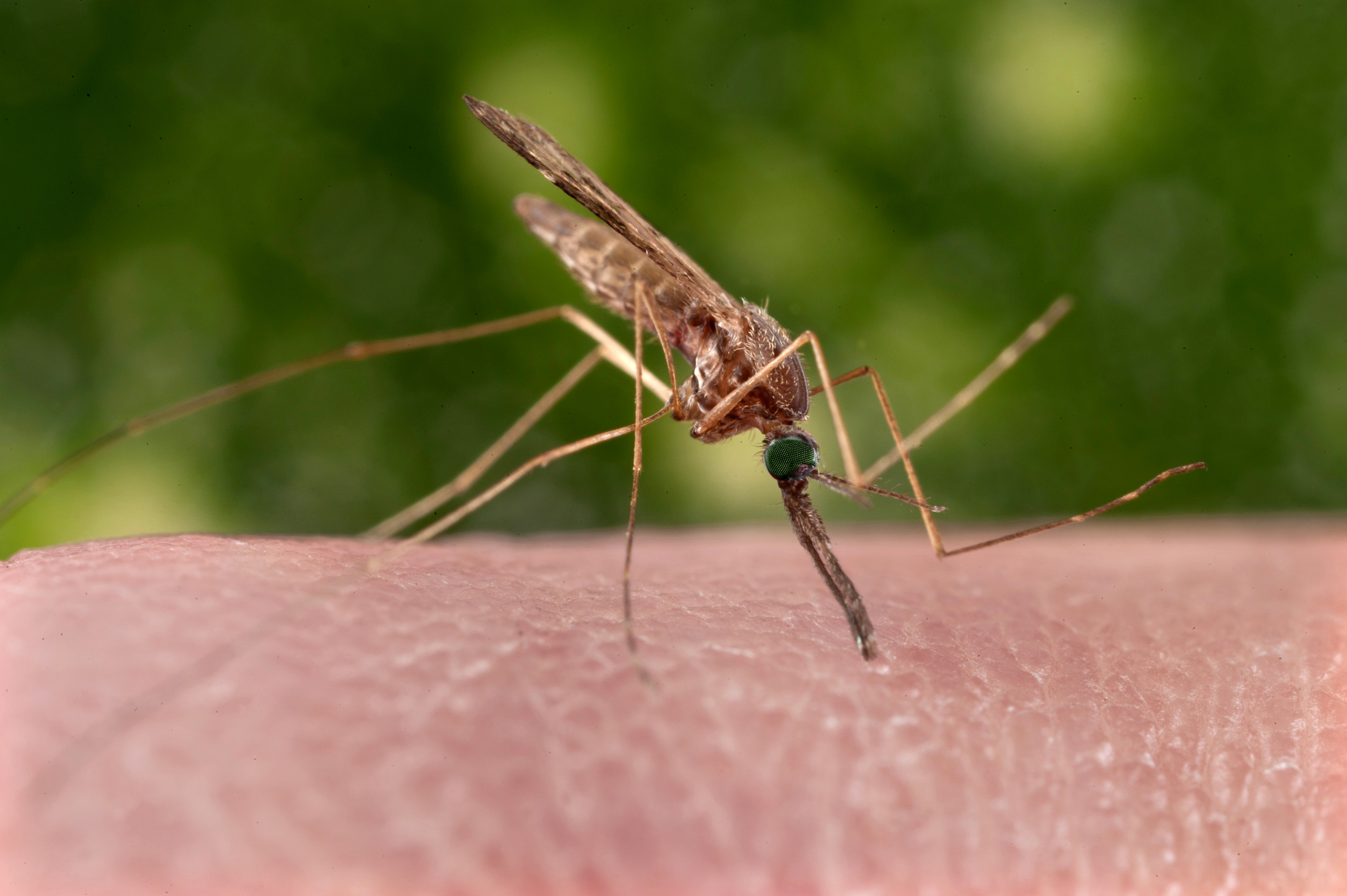

Scientific classification
- Kingdom: Animalia
- Phylum: Arthropoda
- Class: Insecta
- Order: Diptera
- Family: Culicidae
- Genus: Anopheles
- Subgenus: Anopheles
- Species: A. sinensis

Binomial name
- Anopheles sinensis Wiedemann, 1828

= Anopheles sinensis =

Species of mosquito

Anopheles sinensis is a species of mosquito that transmits malaria as well as lymphatic filariasis. It is regarded as the most important vector of these human parasitic diseases in Southeast Asia. It is the primary vector of vivax malaria (Plasmodium vivax) in many regions. In China it also transmits the filalarial parasite (Wuchereria bancrofti), and arthropod roundworm (Romanomermis jingdeensis). In Japan it is also a vector of a roundworm Setaria digitata in sheep and goats.

Because of its similarity with other Anopheles, it is now considered a species complex comprising at least four species. Its genome was sequenced in 2014.

== Taxonomy and description ==
Anopheles sinensis is classified as a species complex, and is a member of An. hyrcanus group. The group is distinguished from other groups by the presence of pale bands (usually four) on the palpi and by the presence of a tuft of dark scales on the clypeus on each side in the female adult. It was first described by German naturalist Christian Rudolph Wilhelm Wiedemann in 1828, and became one of the earliest known species of Anopheles. Due to its similarity with other mosquitos and geographical diversity, the species was redescribed several times by different taxonomists, with names like An. yesoensis (1913), An. sineroides (1924), An. lesetri (1936), An. pullus (1937), and An. yatsushiroensis (1951). These species are considered as either synonyms or members of the species complex.

Female An. sinensis has a dark-coloured body, with its palps are shorter than proboscis. The integument of the neck region is yellow. The legs are dark-brown on outer surface, but pale on the inside. The base of the leg is swollen towards the body. The wings are covered with dark and pale scales. The tip of the wing has a prominent spot. Larva has an elongated head. Its antennae are about the length of the head, and containing pointed spicules towards the inner side.

== Distribution and habitat ==
Anopheles sinensis is found in northeast India, Burma, Thailand, Malaysia, Indonesia, Kampuchea, Vietnam, China, Taiwan, Japan and Korea. In India it is reported from Meghalaya, Assam, and Mizoram. They are found in all types of environment including naturally-made clean water, stagnant or flowing. Their major habitats are rice fields, ditches, streams, irrigation canals, marshes, ponds, and ground pools. They mostly bite large animals, and human biting is relatively less when animals are present nearby. Their feeding takes place throughout the night from dusk to dawn, but heaviest biting occurs between 2 and 4 in the morning. Even though they are attracted by lights, they prefer to bite outdoor. They hibernate mostly under part of dense grasses during October–March. At the end of the hibernation period in March–April they feed during daytime. In August 1962 it was found that An. sinensis was a vector of vivax malaria in Korea. It has become one of the major vectors of vivax in China.

== Genome ==
The draft genome sequence of An. sinensis was published in 2014. It has 3,972 gene clusters containing 11,300 genes that were common to the genomes of the three previously sequenced mosquito species, An. gambiae, A. aegypti, and Culex quinquefasciatus. It contains 16,766 protein-coding genes. 2377 genes had an ortholog belonging to one of the 235 known biological pathways. There are 41 microRNA, 348 tRNA and 2017 rRNA genes.
