= Anopheles dirus =

Scientific classification
- Kingdom: Animalia
- Phylum: Arthropoda
- Clade: Pancrustacea
- Class: Insecta
- Order: Diptera
- Family: Culicidae
- Genus: Anopheles
- Subgenus: Cellia
- (unranked): Neomyzomyia
- Species group: Leucosphyrus group
- Species subgroup: Leucosphyrus subgroup
- Species complex: Dirus species complex Peyton & Harrison, 1979

Species
- Anopheles dirus s.s. (species A); Anopheles crascens (species B); Anopheles scanloni (species C); Anopheles baimaii (species D); Anopheles elegans (species E); Anopheles nemophilous (species F); Anopheles takasagoensis
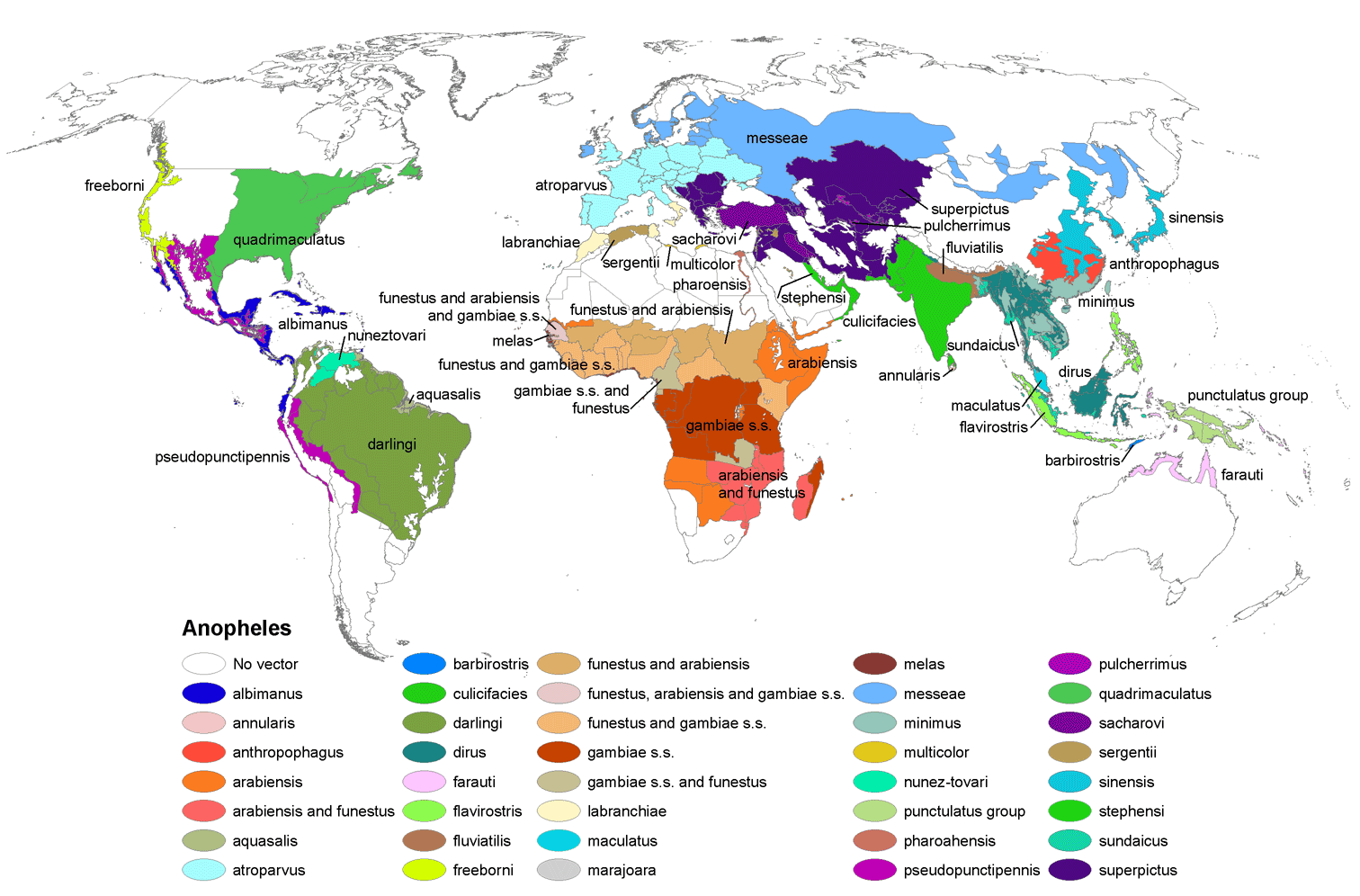
- range map for Anopheles spp.. Anopheles dirus is in cyan in Southeast Asia

Species of mosquito

Anopheles dirus is a vector of malaria in Asian forested zones.

== Taxonomy ==
It is often seen as a species complex including at least seven closely related and efficient forest-based malaria vectors in Asia. Hence, its geographical distribution is overlapping with areas of high malaria prevalence rates and the occurrence of drug resistant Plasmodium falciparum. P. falciparum is one of the four main protozoan parasites that cause malaria and is one of the leading causes of malaria deaths. This species complex is of high medical importance for malaria control, in view of the biological specificities of the members of this complex. Sympatric sibling species of the complex differ in types of larval habitat, seasonality and behaviour. These differences also exist within the species suggesting the role of environmental factors in determining these.

== Distribution ==
The complex has been reported mainly from Northeast India, Bangladesh, Myanmar and Thailand. It has also been reported from other areas in India such as Jammu & Kashmir and Andaman Islands. One of the species in the complex has also been reported from Shimoga in South India although its vectorial status is unknown. GIS-based predictive habitat modelling has revealed that over half of several Northeast Indian states, whole of Thailand and nearly a third of large areas in South Indian states like Kerala and Goa could harbour this complex.

== Hosts ==
Hosts include cattle.

== Control ==
Insecticide resistance is an increasing concern in southeast Asia. Although ivermectin is thought of as solely an endoparasiticide, it has proven effective as an endectocide against An. dirus. Cramer et al 2021 use zooprophylaxis-aided ivermectin-based vector elimination (ZAIVE), injecting cattle with the antiparasitic and getting at least 30 days of increased mortality in this species and An. epiroticus.
