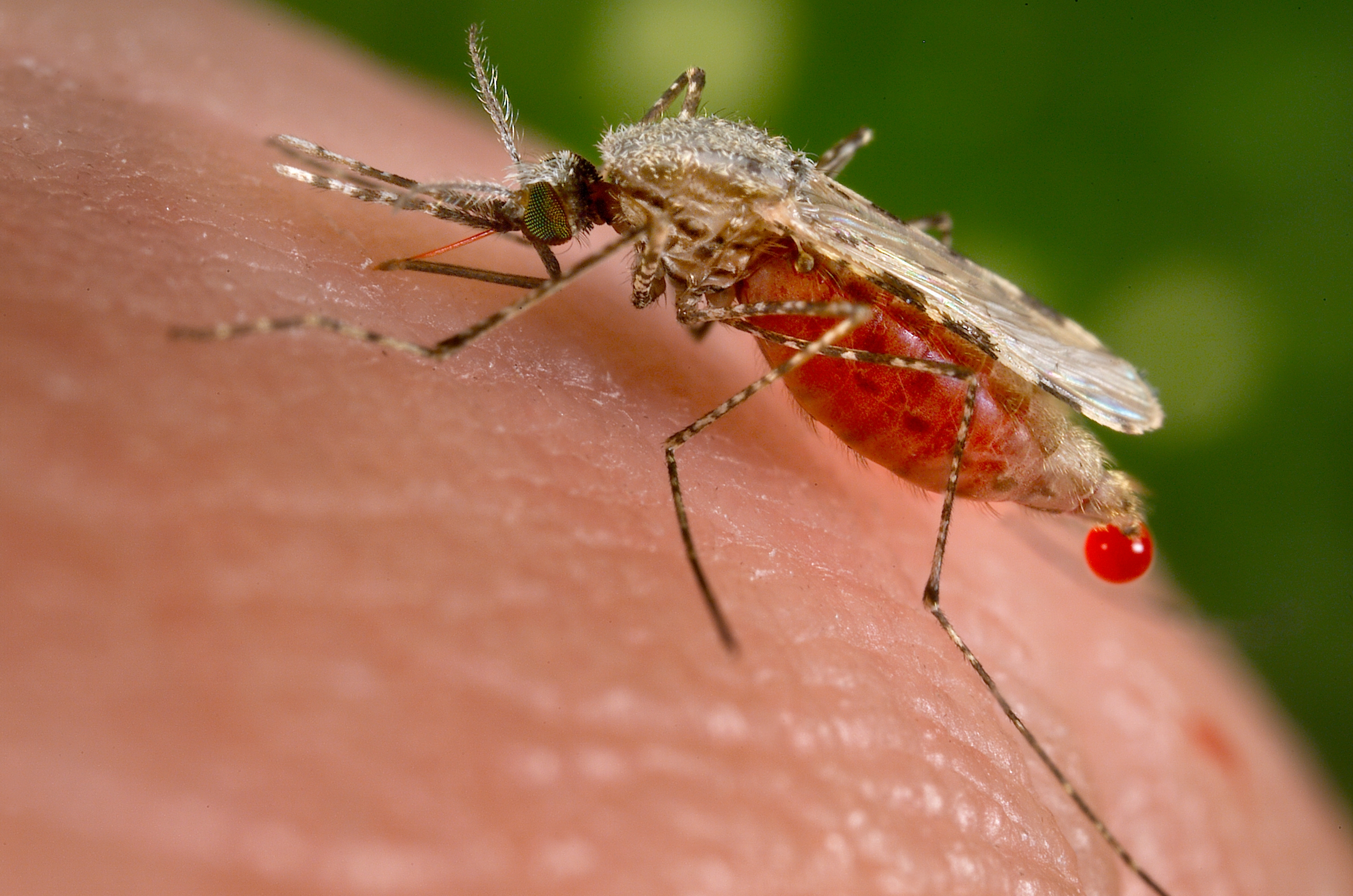
- Anopheles stephensi

Scientific classification
- Kingdom: Animalia
- Phylum: Arthropoda
- Clade: Pancrustacea
- Class: Insecta
- Order: Diptera
- Family: Culicidae
- Subfamily: Anophelinae
- Genus: Anopheles

Subgenera
- Anopheles; Baimaia; Cellia; Kerteszia; Lophopodomyia; Nyssorhynchus; Stethomyia

= Taxonomy of Anopheles =

Genus of flies

Anopheles is a genus of mosquitoes (Culicidae) with about 484 recognised species.

== Classification ==
The classification of this genus began in 1901 with Frederick Vincent Theobald. Despite the passage of time, the taxonomy remains incompletely settled. Classification into species is based on morphological characteristics - wing spots, head anatomy, larval and pupal anatomy, and chromosome structure, and more recently on DNA sequences.

The genus Anopheles belongs to a subfamily Anophelinae with three genera: Anopheles Meigen (nearly worldwide distribution), Bironella Theobald (Australia only: 11 described species) and Chagasia Cruz (Neotropics: four described species). The genus Bironella has been divided into three subgenera: Bironella Theobald (two species), Brugella Edwards (three species) and Neobironella Tenorio (three species). Bironella appears to be the sister taxon to the Anopheles, with Chagasia forming the outgroup in this subfamily.

The type species of the genus is Anopheles maculipennis.

=== Subgenera ===
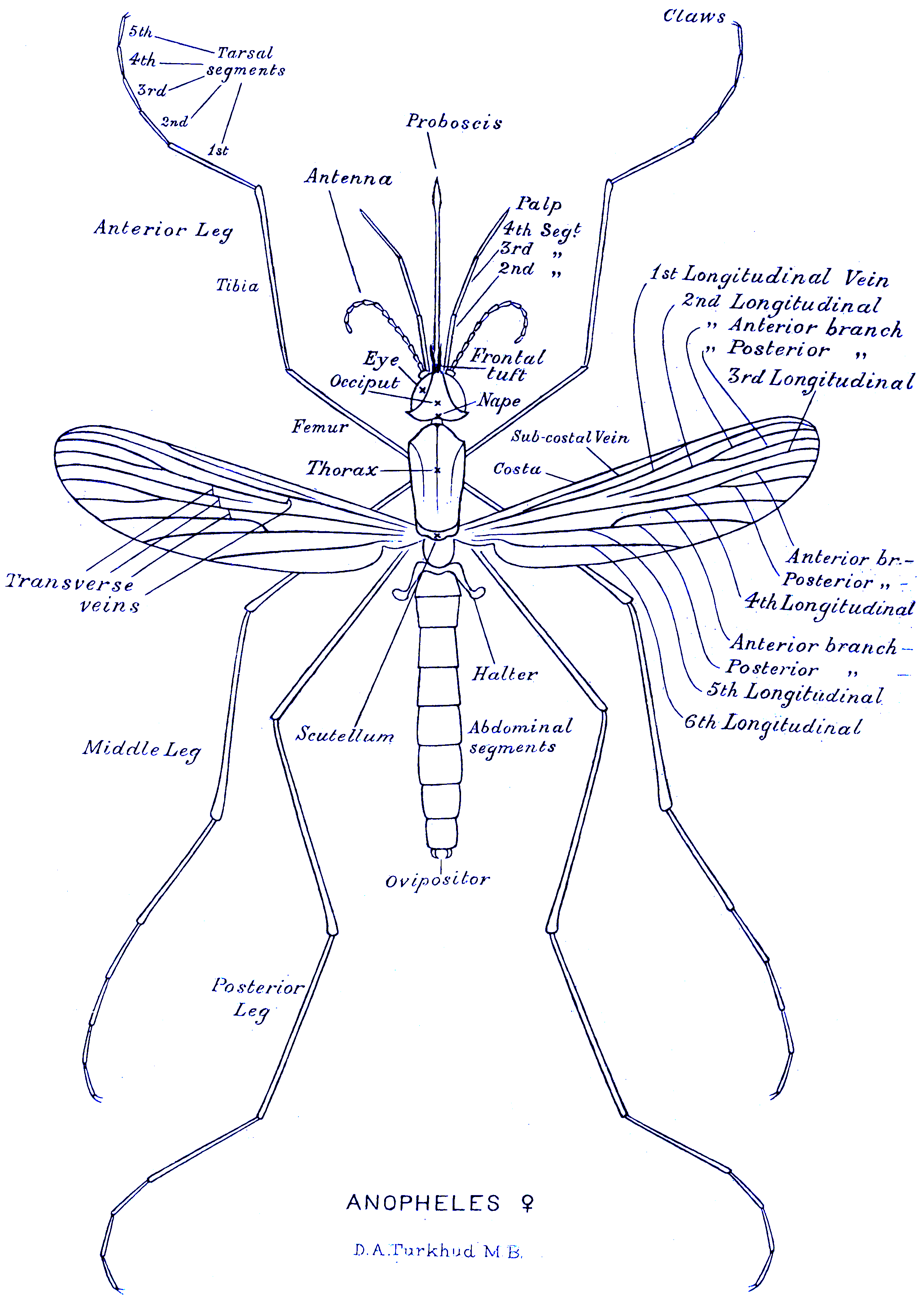
Morphology of female Anopheles

The genus has been subdivided into seven subgenera based primarily on the number and positions of specialized setae on the gonocoxites of the male genitalia. The system of subgenera originated with the work of Christophers, who in 1915 described three subgenera: Anopheles (widely distributed), Myzomyia (later renamed Cellia) (Old World) and Nyssorhynchus (Neotropical). Nyssorhynchus was first described as Lavernia by Theobald. Frederick Wallace Edwards in 1932 added the subgenus Stethomyia (Neotropical distribution). Kerteszia was also described by Edwards in 1932, but then was recognised as a subgrouping of Nyssorhynchus. It was elevated to subgenus status by Komp in 1937; this subgenus is also found in the Neotropics. Two additional subgenera have since been recognised: Baimaia (Southeast Asia only) by Harbach et al. in 2005 and Lophopodomyia (Neotropical) by Antunes in 1937.

One species within each subgenus has been identified as the type species of that particular subgenus:

- Subgenus Anopheles - Anopheles maculipennis Meigen 1818
- Subgenus Baimaia - Anopheles kyondawensis Abraham 1947
- Subgenus Cellia - Anopheles pharoensis Giles 1899
- Subgenus Kerteszia - Anopheles boliviensis Theobald 1905
- Subgenus Lophopodomyia - Anopheles squamifemur Antunes 1937
- Subgenus Nyssorhynchus - Anopheles argyritarsis Robineau-Desvoidy 1827
- Subgenus Stethomyia - Anopheles nimbus Theobald 1902

Within the genus Anopheles are two main groupings, one formed by the Cellia and Anopheles subgenera and a second by Kerteszia, Lophopodomyia, and Nyssorhynchus. Subgenus Stethomyia is an outlier with respect to these two taxa. Within the second group, Kerteszia and Nyssorhynchus appear to be sister taxa. Cellia appears to be more closely related to the Kerteszia-Lophopodomyia-Nyssorhynchus group than to Anopheles or Stethomyia, tentatively suggesting the following branching order: ( Stethomyia ( Anopheles ( Cellia ( Lophopodomyia ( Kerteszia, Nyssorhynchus))))).

The number of species currently recognised within the subgenera is given here in parentheses: Anopheles (206 species), Baimaia (one), Cellia (239), Kerteszia (12), Lophopodomyia (six), Nyssorhynchus (34) and Stethomyia (five).

The subgenus Baimaia may be elevated to genus level, as it appears to be a sister group to Bironella and all other Anopheles.

=== Divisions below subgenus ===
Taxonomic units between subgenus and species are not currently recognised as official zoological names. In practice, a number of taxonomic levels have been introduced. The larger subgenera (Anopheles, Cellia, and Nyssorhynchus) have been subdivided into sections and series, which in turn have been divided into groups and subgroups. Below subgroup but above species level is the species complex. Taxonomic levels above species complex can be distinguished on morphological grounds. Species within a species complex are either morphologically identical or extremely similar and can only be reliably separated by microscopic examination of the chromosomes or DNA sequencing. The classification continues to be revised.

The first species complex was described in 1926 when the problem of nontransmission of malaria by Anopheles gambiae was solved by Falleroni, who recognised that An. gambiae was a complex of six species, of which only four could transmit malaria. This complex has subsequently been revised to a total of seven species of which five transmit malaria.

Subgenus Nyssorhynchus has been divided in three sections: Albimanus (19 species), Argyritarsis (11 species) and Myzorhynchella (four species). The Argyritarsis section has been subdivided into Albitarsis and Argyritarsis groups.

The Anopheles group was divided by Edwards into four series: Anopheles (worldwide), Myzorhynchus (Palearctic, Oriental, Australasian and Afrotropical), Cycloleppteron (Neotropical) and Lophoscelomyia (Oriental); and two groups, Arribalzagia (Neotropical) and Christya (Afrotropical). Reid and Knight (1961) modified this classification by subdividing the subgenus Anopheles into two sections, Angusticorn and Laticorn and six series. The division was based on the shape of their pupal trumpets. The Laticorn section was created for those species with wide, funnel-shaped trumpets having the longest axis transverse to the stem, and the Angusticorn section for species with semitubular trumpets having the longest axis vertical more or less in line with the stem. The earlier Arribalzagia and Christya groups were considered to be series. The Angusticorn section includes members of the Anopheles, Cycloleppteron, and Lophoscelomyia series, and the Laticorn section includes the Arribalzagia (24 species), Christya, and Myzorhynchus series.

Cellia is the largest subgenus: all species within this subgenus are found in the Old World. It has been divided into six series - Cellia (eight species), Myzomyia (69 species), Neocellia (33 species), Neomyzomyia (99 species), Paramyzomyia (six species) and Pyretophorus (22 species). This classification was developed by Grjebine (in 1966), Reid (in 1968), and Gillies & de Meillon (also in 1968) based on the work by Edwards in 1932. Series definition within this subgenus is based on the cibarial armature - a collection of specialized spicules borne ventrally at the posterior margin of the cibarium - which was first used as a taxonomic method by Christophers in 1933.

Kerteszia is a small subgenus found in South America whose larvae have specific ecological requirements; these can only develop within water that accumulates at the base of the follicular axis of the epiphytic Bromeliaceae. Unlike the majority of mosquitoes, species in this subgenus are active during the day.

Within a number of species, separate subspecies have been identified. The diagnostic criteria and characteristic features of each subgenus are discussed on the own page.

=== Species complexes ===
Anopheles nuneztovari is a species complex with at least one occurring in Colombia and Venezuela and another occurring in the Amazon Basin.

== Species listing ==
Species that have been shown to be vectors of human malaria are marked with a star (*) after the name.

=== Subgenus Anopheles ===
Anopheles anthropophagus Xu & Feng 1975
Anopheles confusa
Anopheles derooki Soesilo & Van Slooten 1931
Anopheles gracilis Theobald 1905
Anopheles hollandi Taylor 1934
Anopheles obscura Tenorio 1975
Anopheles papuae Swellengrebel & Swellengrebel de Graaf 1919
Anopheles simmondsi Tenorio 1977
Anopheles travestita Brug 1928

Section Angusticorn

Series Anopheles

Anopheles algeriensis Theobald 1903
Anopheles concolor Edwards 1938
Anopheles marteri

subspecies marteri
subspecies sogdianus Keshishian

Complex Claviger (Coluzzi et al. 1965)

Anopheles claviger* Meigen 1804
Anopheles petragnani Del Vecchio 1939

Group Aitkenii (Reid & Knight, 1961)

Anopheles aberrans Harrison & Scanlon 1975
Anopheles acaci Baisas 1946
Anopheles aitkenii James 1903
Anopheles bengalensis Puri 1930
Anopheles borneensis McArthur 1949
Anopheles fragilis Theobald 1903
Anopheles insulaeflorum Swellengrebel & Swellengrebel de Graaf 1919
Anopheles palmatus Rodenwaldt 1926
Anopheles peytoni Kulasekera Harrison & Amerasinghe 1989
Anopheles pilinotum Harrison & Scanlon 1974
Anopheles pinjaurensis Barraud 1932
Anopheles stricklandi Reid 1965
Anopheles tigertti Scanlon & Peyton 1967

Group Alongensis (Phan et al. 1991)

Anopheles alongensis Evenhuis 1940
Anopheles cucphuongensis Phan, Manh, Hinh & Vien 1991

Group Atratipes (Lee et al. 1987)

Anopheles atratipes Skuse 1889
Anopheles tasmaniensis Dobrowtorsky 1966

Group Culiciformis (Reid & Knight 1961)

Anopheles culiciformis Cogill 1903
Anopheles sintoni Puri 1929
Anopheles sintonoides Ho 1938

Group Lindesayi (Reid & Knight 1961)

Anopheles mengalengensis Ma 1981
Anopheles nilgiricus Christophers 1924
Anopheles wellingtonianus Alcock 1912

Complex Gigas (Harrison et al. 1991)

Anopheles baileyi Edwards 1923
Anopheles gigas Giles 1901

subspecies crockeri Colless
subspecies danaubento Mochtar & Walandouw
subspecies formosus Ludlow
subspecies gigas Giles
subspecies oedjalikalah Nainggolan
subspecies pantjarbatu Waktoedi
subspecies refutans Alcock
subspecies simlensis James
subspecies sumatrana Swellengrebel & Rodenwaldt

Complex Lindesayi (Harrison et al. 1991)

Anopheles lindesayi Giles 1900

subspecies benguetensis King
subspecies cameronensis Edwards
subspecies japonicus Yamada
subspecies lindesayi Giles
subspecies pleccau Koidzumi

Group Maculipennis (Reid & Knight 1961)

Anopheles atropos Dyar & Knab 1906

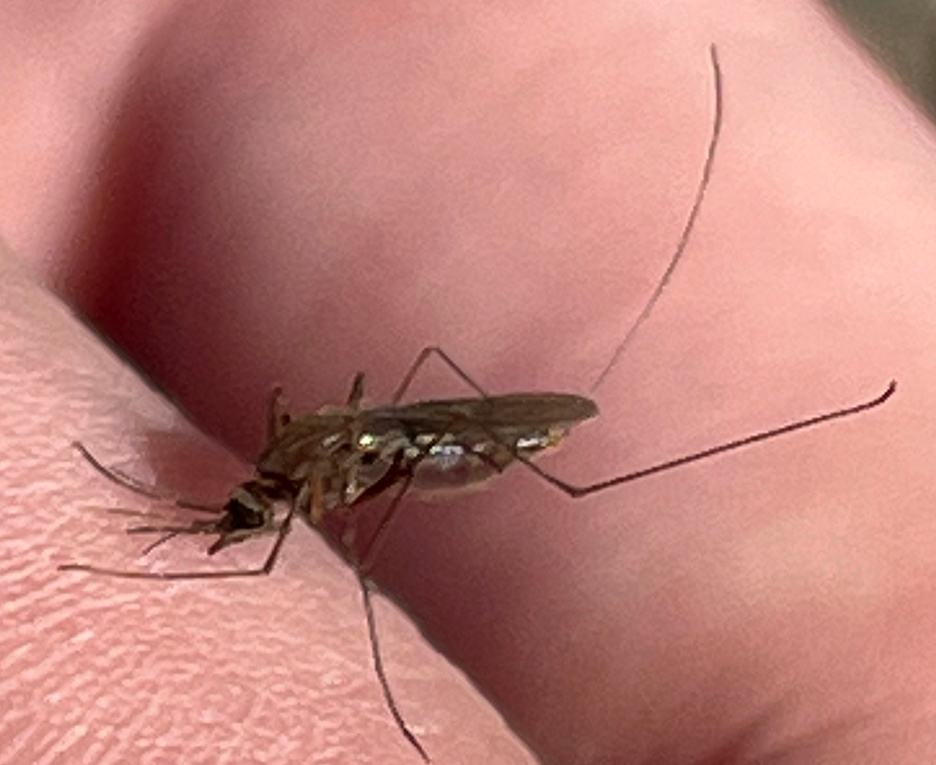
A. atropos

Anopheles aztecus Hoffmann 1935
Anopheles lewisi Ludlow 1920
Anopheles walkeri

Complex Quadrimaculatus (Linton 2004)

Anopheles diluvialis Reinert 1997
Anopheles inundatus Reinert 1997
Anopheles maverlius Reinert 1997
Anopheles smaragdinus Reinert 1997
Anopheles quadrimaculatus* Say 1824

Subgroup Freeborni (Linton 2004)

Anopheles earlei Vargas 1943
Anopheles freeborni* Aitken 1939
Anopheles hermsi Barr & Guptavanij 1989

Subgroup Maculipennis (Linton 2004)

Anopheles artemievi Gordeyev, Zvantsov, Goryacheva, Shaikevich & Yezhov
Anopheles atroparvus* Van Thiel 1927
Anopheles beklemishevi Stegnii & Kabanova 1976

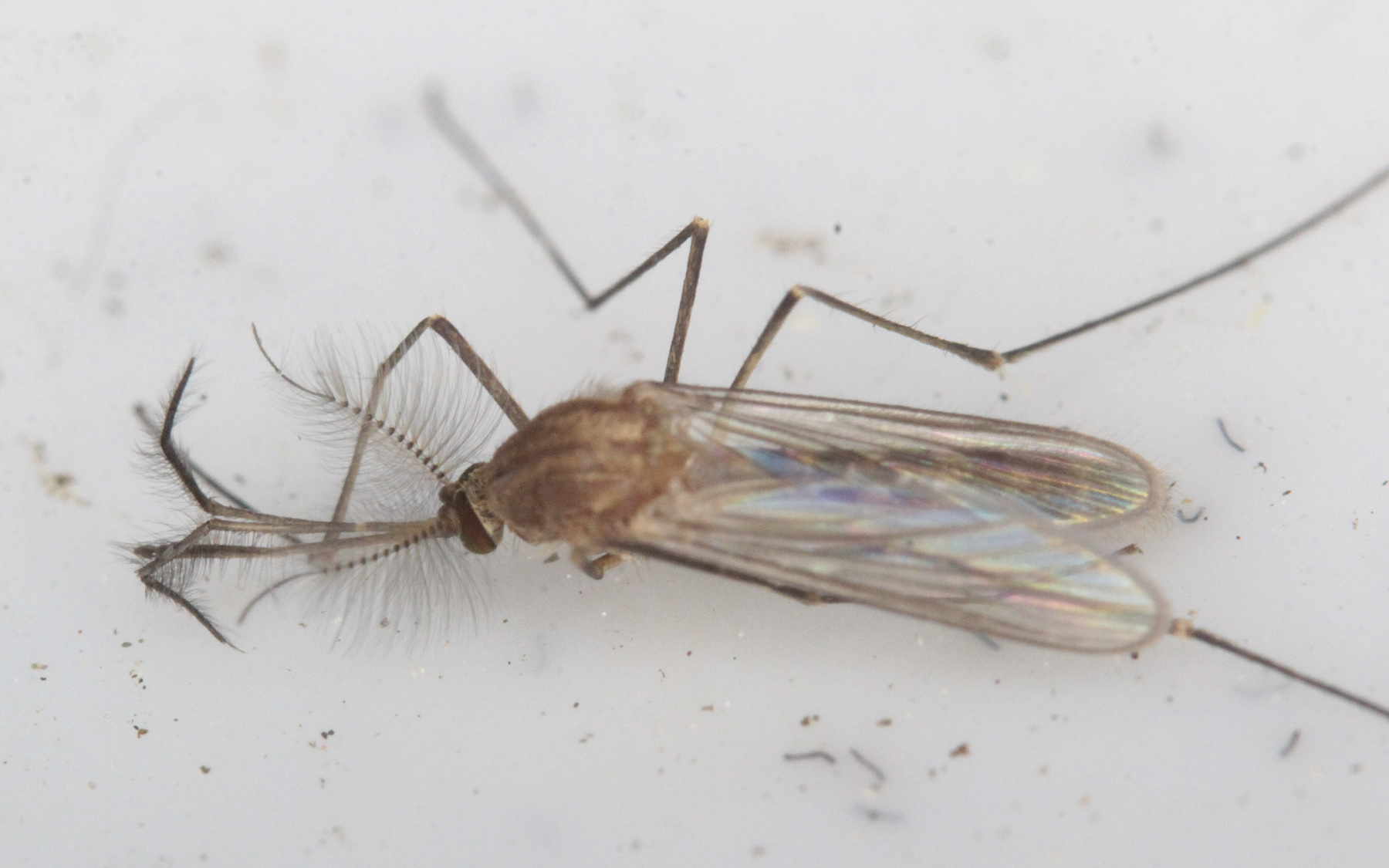
A. beklemishevi

Anopheles daciae Linton, Nicolescu & Harbach 2004
Anopheles labranchiae* Falleroni 1926
Anopheles maculipennis
Anopheles martinius Shingarev 1926
Anopheles melanoon* Hackett 1934
Anopheles messeae* Falleroni 1926
Anopheles occidentalis Dyar & Knab 1906

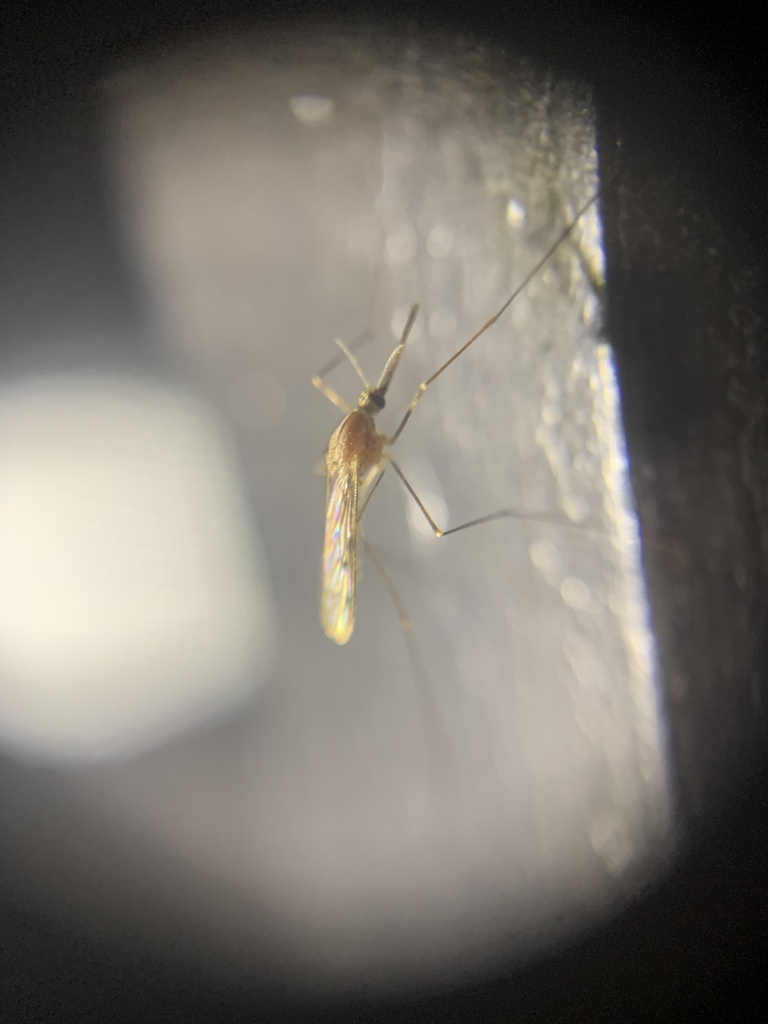
A. occidentalis

Anopheles persiensis Linton, Sedaghat & Harbach 2003
Anopheles sacharovi* Favre 1903
Anopheles sicaulti Roubaud 1935
Anopheles subalpinus Hackett & Lewis 1935

Group Plumbeus (Reid & Knight 1961)

Anopheles arboricola Zavortink 1970
Anopheles barberi Coquillett 1903
Anopheles barianensis James 1911
Anopheles fausti Vargas 1943
Anopheles judithae Zavortink 1969
Anopheles omorii Sakakibara 1959
Anopheles plumbeus* Stegnii & Kabanova 1828
Anopheles powderi Zavortink 1970
Anopheles xelajuensis De Leon 1938

Group Pseudopunctipennis (Reid & Knight 1961)

Anopheles chiriquiensis Komp 1936
Anopheles franciscanus McCracken 1904
Anopheles hectoris Giaquinto-Mira 1931
Anopheles tibiamaculatus Neiva 1906
Anopheles eiseni Coquillett 1902

subspecies eiseni Coquillett
subspecies geometricus Corrêa

Anopheles parapunctipennis* Martini 1932

subspecies guatemalensis de Leon
subspecies parapunctipennis Martini

Anopheles pseudopunctipennis

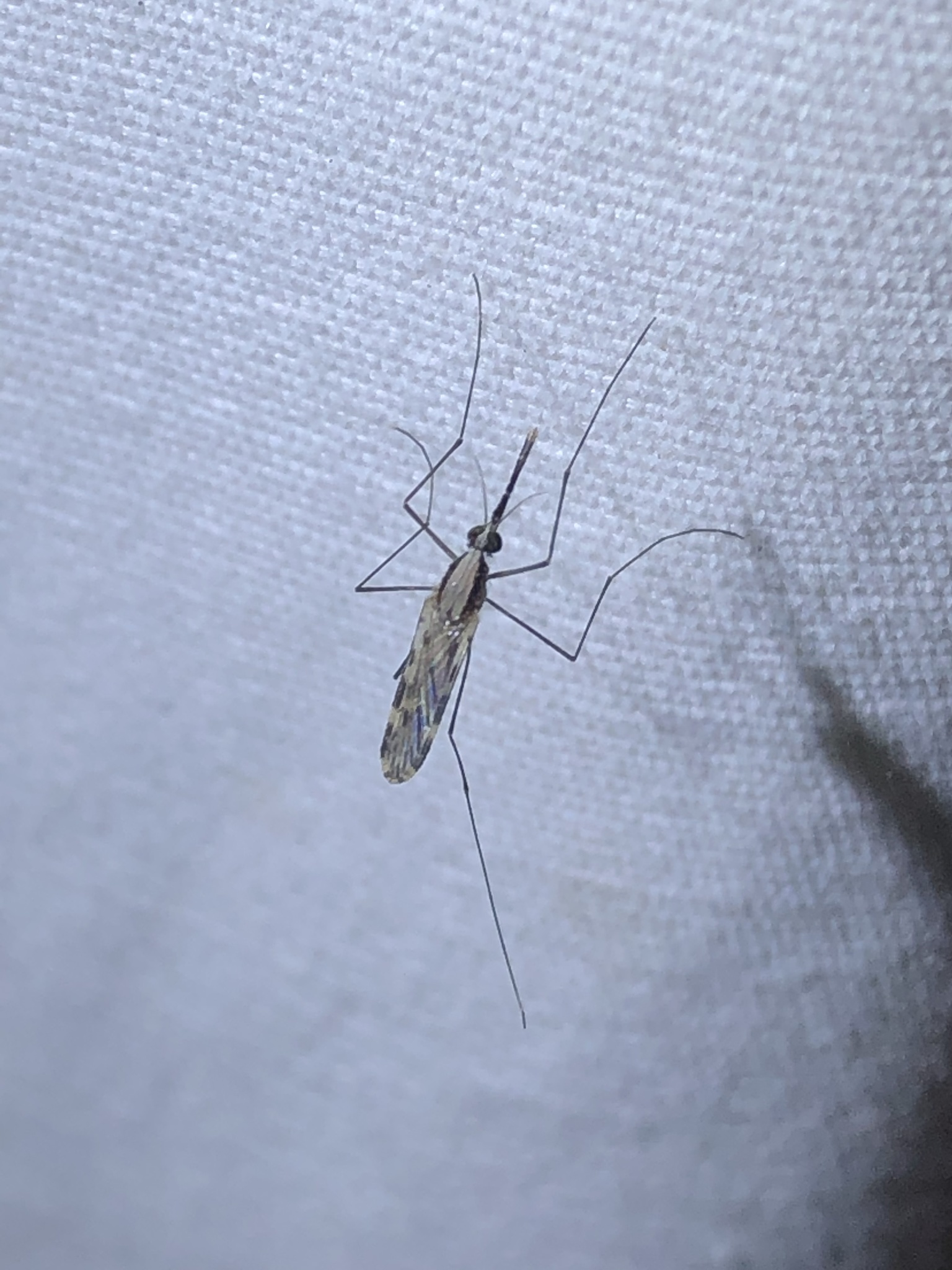
A. pseudopunctipennis

subspecies levicastilloi Levi-Castillo
subspecies neghmei Mann
subspecies noei Mann
subspecies patersoni Alvarado & Heredia
subspecies pseudopunctipennis Theobald
subspecies rivadeneirai Levi-Castillo

Group Punctipennis (Reid & Knight 1961)

Anopheles perplexens Ludlow 1907

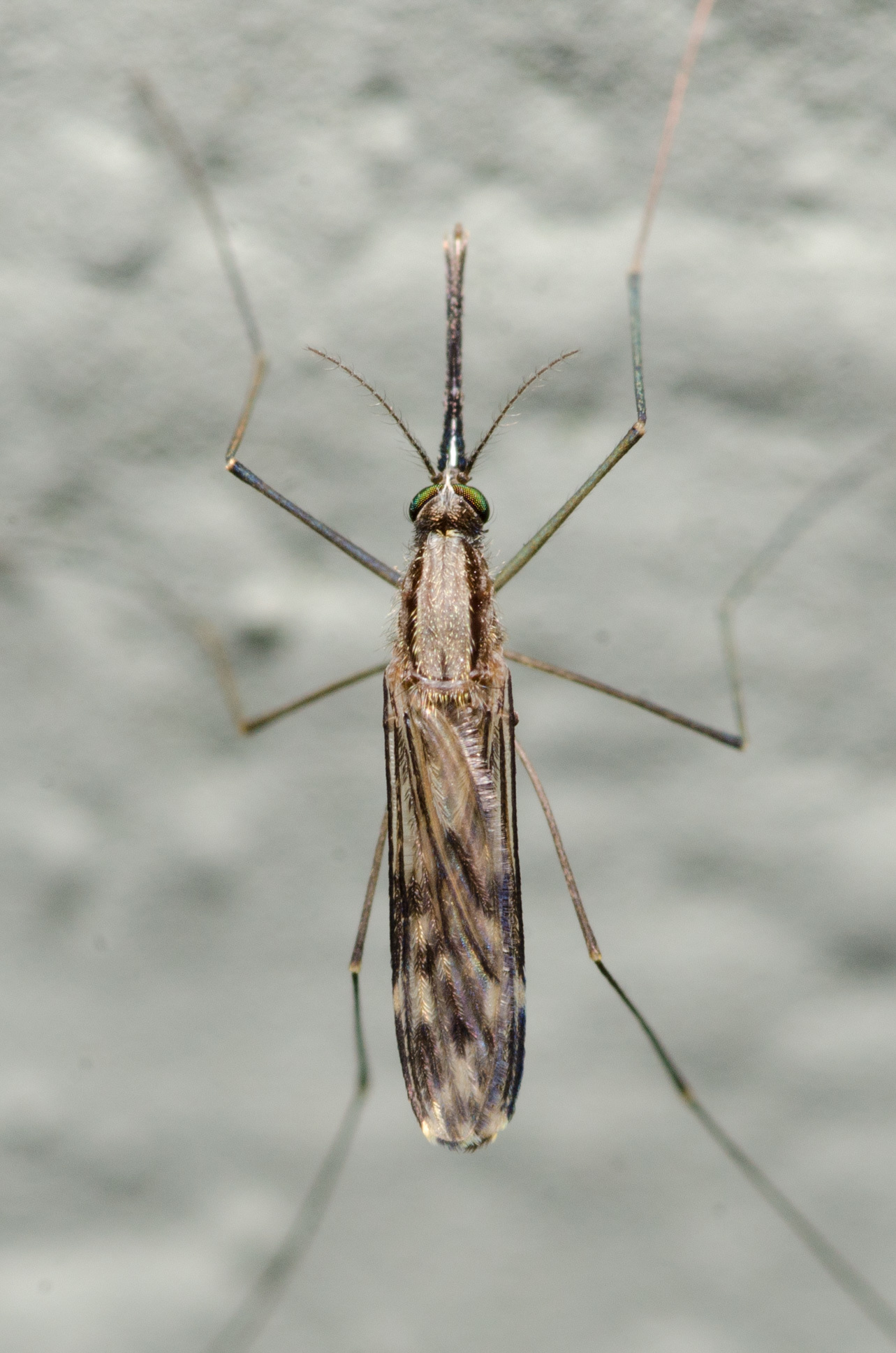
A. perplexens

Anopheles punctipennis Say 1823

Complex Crucians (Wilkerson et al. 2004)

Anopheles bradleyi King 1939
Anopheles crucians Wiedemann 1828
Anopheles georgianus King 1939

Group Stigmaticus (Reid & Knight 1961)

Anopheles colledgei Marks 1956
Anopheles corethroides Theobald 1907
Anopheles papuensis Dobrowtorsky 1957
Anopheles powelli Lee 1944
Anopheles pseudostigmaticus Dobrowtorsky 1957
Anopheles stigmaticus Skuse 1889

Series Cycloleppteron (Edwards 1932)

Anopheles annulipalpis Lynch 1878
Anopheles grabhamii

Series Lophoscelomyia (Edwards 1932)

Anopheles bulkleyi Causey 1937

Group Asiaticus (Reid 1968)

Anopheles annandalei Prashad 1918
Anopheles noniae Reid 1963

Subgroup Asiaticus (Rattanarithikul et al. 2004)

Anopheles asiaticus Leicester 1903

Subgroup Interruptus (Rattanarithikul et al. 2004)

Anopheles interruptus Puri 1929

Section Laticorn (Reid & Knight 1961)

Series Arribalzagia (Root 1922)

Anopheles anchietai Correa & Ramalho 1968
Anopheles apicimacula Dyar & Knab 1906
Anopheles bustamentei Galvao 1955
Anopheles calderoni Wilkerson 1991
Anopheles costai Da Fonseca & Da Silva Ramos 1939
Anopheles evandroi Da Costa Lima 1937
Anopheles fluminensis Root 1927
Anopheles forattinii Wilkerson 1999
Anopheles gabaldoni Vargas 1941
Anopheles guarao Anduze & Capdevielle 1949
Anopheles intermedius* Peryassu 1908
Anopheles maculipes Theobald 1903
Anopheles malefactor Dyar & Knab 1907
Anopheles mattogrossensis Lutz & Neiva 1911
Anopheles mediopunctatus Lutz 1903
Anopheles minor Da Costa Lima 1929
Anopheles neomaculipalpis Curry 1931
Anopheles peryassui Dyar & Knab 1908
Anopheles pseudomaculipes Peryassu 1908
Anopheles punctimacula Dyar & Knab 1906
Anopheles mediopunctatus Lutz 1903
Anopheles rachoui Galvao 1952
Anopheles shannoni Davis 1931
Anopheles veruslanei Vargas 1979
Anopheles vestitipennis Dyar & Knab 1906

Series Christya (Christophers 1924)

Anopheles implexus Theobald 1903
Anopheles okuensis Brunhes, le Goff & Geoffroy 1997

Series Myzorhynchus (Edwards 1932)

Anopheles obscurus Grunberg 1905
Anopheles bancroftii Giles 1902
Anopheles barbirostris* Van der Wulp 1884
Anopheles pollicaris Reid 1962

Group Albotaeniatus (Reid & Knight 1961)

Anopheles albotaeniatus Theobald 1903
Anopheles balerensis Mendoza 1947
Anopheles ejercitoi Mendoza 1947
Anopheles montanus Stanton & Hacker 1917
Anopheles saperoi Bohart & Ingram 1946

subspecies ohamai Ohama
subspecies saperoi Bohart & Ingram

Group Bancroftii (Reid & Knight 1961)

Anopheles pseudobarbirostris Ludlow 1935
Anopheles bancroftii Giles 1902

subspecies bancroftii Giles
subspecies barbiventris Brug

Group Barbirostris (Reid & Knight 1961)

Anopheles freyi Meng 1957
Anopheles koreicus Yamada & Watanabe 1918

Subgroup Barbirostris (Reid 1968)

Anopheles barbirostris van der Wulp 1884
Anopheles campestris Reid 1962
Anopheles donaldi Reid 1962
Anopheles franciscoi Reid 1962
Anopheles hodgkini Reid 1962
Anopheles pollicaris Reid 1962

Subgroup Vanus (Reid 1968)

Anopheles ahomi Chowdhury 1929
Anopheles barbumbrosus Strickland & Chowdhury 1927
Anopheles manalangi Mendoza 1940
Anopheles reidi Harrison 1973
Anopheles vanus Walker 1859

Group Coustani (Reid & Knight 1961)

Anopheles caliginosus De Meillon 1943
Anopheles coustani Laveran 1900

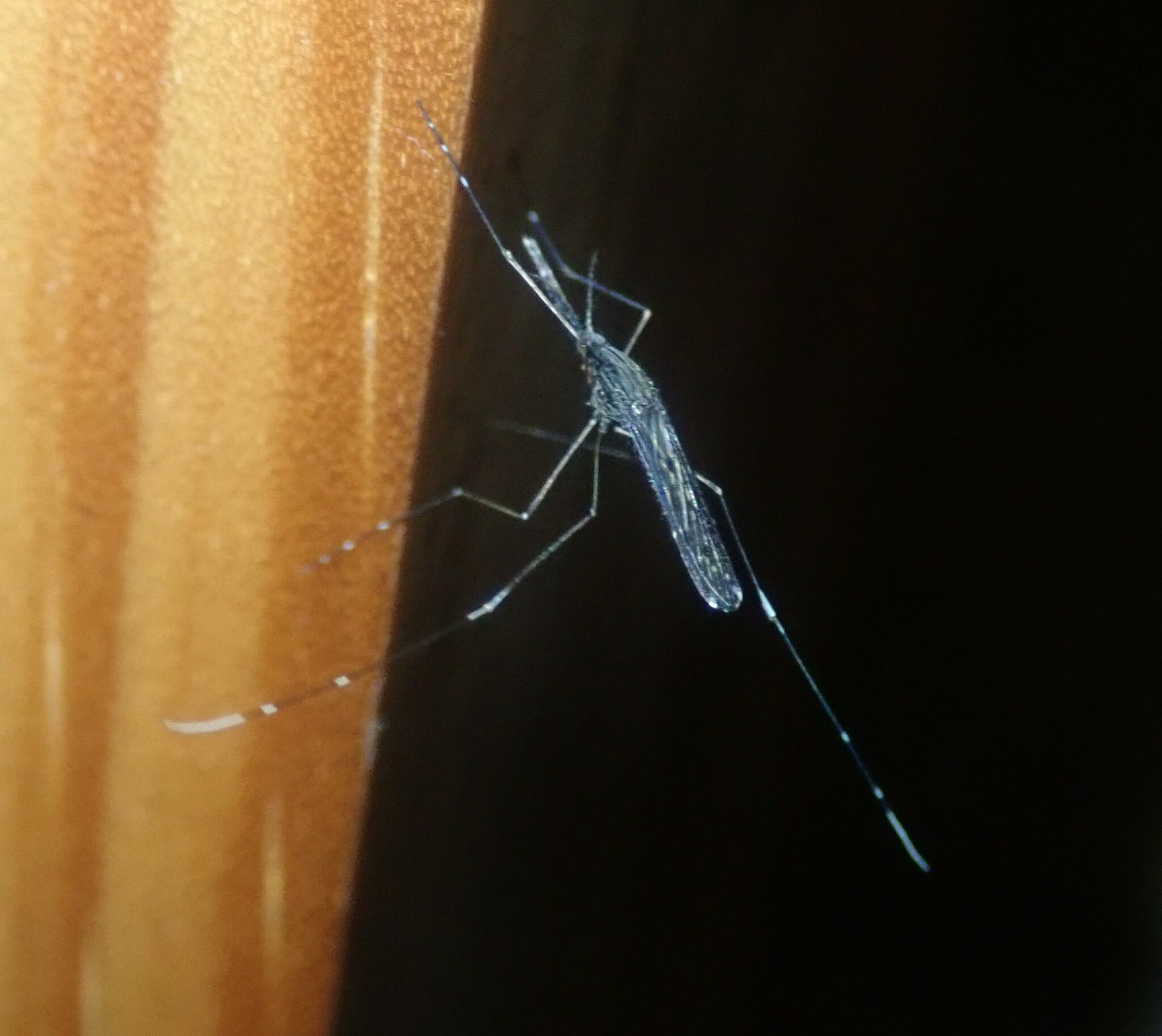
A. coustani

Anopheles crypticus Coetzee 1994
Anopheles fuscicolor Van Someren 1947
Anopheles namibiensis Coetzee 1984
Anopheles paludis Theobald 1900
Anopheles symesi Edwards 1928
Anopheles tenebrosus Donitz 1902
Anopheles ziemanni Grunberg 1902

Group Hyrcanus (Reid 1953)

Anopheles anthropophagus Xu and Feng 1975
Anopheles argyropus Swellengrebel 1914
Anopheles belenrae Rueda 2005
Anopheles changfus Ma 1981
Anopheles chodukini Martini 1929
Anopheles dazhaius Ma 1981
Anopheles engarensis Kanda & Oguma 1978
Anopheles hailarensis Xu JinJiang & Luo XinFu 1998
Anopheles heiheensis Ma 1981
Anopheles hyrcanus* Pallas 1771

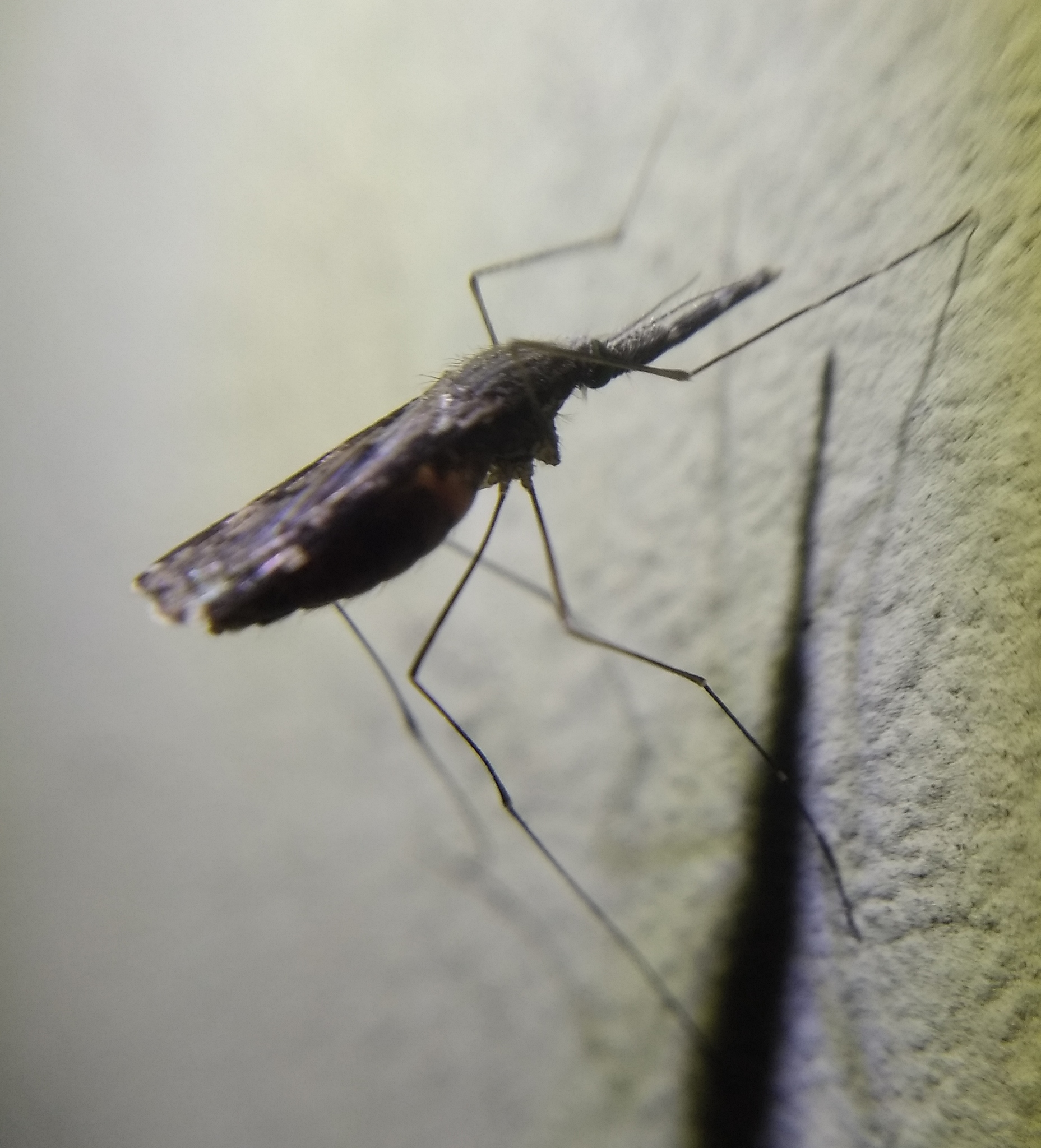
A. hyrcanus

Anopheles junlianensis Lei 1996
Anopheles kiangsuensis Xu and Feng 1975
Anopheles kleini Rueda 2005
Anopheles kummingensis Dong & Wang 1985
Anopheles kweiyangensis Yao & Wu 1944
Anopheles liangshanensis Kang Tan Cao Cheng Yang & Huang 1984
Anopheles nimpe Nguyen, Tran & Harbach
Anopheles pseudopictus Graham 1899
Anopheles pullus Yamada 1937
Anopheles sinensis* Wiedemann 1828
Anopheles sineroides Yamada 1924
Anopheles xiaokuanus Ma 1981
Anopheles xui Dong, Zhou, Dong & Mao 2007
Anopheles yatsushiroensis Miyazaki 1951

Subgroup Lesteri (Harrison 1972)

Anopheles crawfordi Reid 1953
Anopheles kiangsuensis Xu & Feng 1975
Anopheles lesteri de Meillon 1931
Anopheles paraliae Sandosham 1959
Anopheles peditaeniatus Leicester 1908
Anopheles vietnamensis Manh Hinh & Vien 1993

Subgroup Nigerrimus (Harrison 1972)

Anopheles nigerrimus* Giles 1900
Anopheles nitidus Harrison, Scanlon & Reid 1973
Anopheles pseudosinensis Baisas 1935
Anopheles pursati Laveran 1902

Group Umbrosus (Reid 1950)

Anopheles brevipalpis Roper 1914
Anopheles brevirostris Reid 1950
Anopheles hunteri Strickland 1916
Anopheles samarensis Rozeboom 1951
Anopheles similissimus Strickland & Chowdhury 1927

Subgroup Baezai (Rattanarithikul et al. 2004)

Anopheles baezai Gater 1934

Subgroup Letifer (Reid 1968)

Anopheles collessi Reid 1963
Anopheles letifer* Sandosham 1944
Anopheles roperi Reid 1950
Anopheles whartoni Reid 1963

Subgroup Separatus (Rattanarithikul et al. 2004)

Anopheles separatus Leicester 1908

Subgroup Umbrosus (Rattanarithikul et al. 2004)

Anopheles umbrosus Theobald 1903

=== Subgenus Baimaia ===
Anopheles kyondawensisAbraham 1947

=== Subgenus Cellia ===
Anopheles rageaui Mattingly and Adam

Series Cellia (Christophers 1924)

Anopheles argenteolobatus Gough 1910
Anopheles brumpti Hamon & Rickenbach 1955
Anopheles carnevalei Brunhes le Goff & Geoffroy 1999
Anopheles cristipalpis Service 1977
Anopheles murphyi Gillies 1968
Anopheles pharoensis Theobald 1901
Anopheles swahilicus Gillies 1964

Group Squamosus (Grjebine 1966)

Anopheles cydippis de Meillon 1931
Anopheles squamosusTheobald 1901

Series Myzomyia

Anopheles apoci Marsh 1933
Anopheles azaniae Bailly-Choumara 1960
Anopheles barberellus Evans 1932
Anopheles brunnipes Theobald 1910
Anopheles domicola Edwards 1916
Anopheles dthali Patton 1905
Anopheles erythraeus Corradetti 1939
Anopheles ethiopicus Gillies & Coetzee 1987
Anopheles flavicosta Edwards 1911
Anopheles fontinalis Gillies 1968
Anopheles majidi Young & Majid 1928
Anopheles moucheti* Evans 1925

subspecies bervoetsi D'Haenans 1961
subspecies moucheti Evans 1925
subspecies nigeriensis

Anopheles schwetzi Evans 1934
Anopheles tchekedii de Meillon & Leeson 1940
Anopheles walravensi Edwards 1930

Group Demeilloni (Gillies & De Meillon 1962)

Anopheles carteri Evans & de Meillon 1933
Anopheles demeilloni Evans 1933
Anopheles freetownensis Evans 1925
Anopheles garnhami Edwards 1930
Anopheles keniensis Evans 1931
Anopheles lloreti Gil Collado 1936
Anopheles sergentii* Theobald 1907

subspecies macmahoni Evans 1936
subspecies sergentii Theobald 1907

Group Funestus (Garros et al 2004)

Anopheles jeyporiensis James 1902

Subgroup Aconitus (Chen et al. 2003)

Anopheles aconitus Dönitz 1902
Anopheles filipinae Manalang 1930
Anopheles mangyanus Banks 1906
Anopheles pampanai Buttiker & Beales 1959
Anopheles varuna Iyengar 1924

Subgroup Culicifacies (Garros et al. 2004)

Anopheles culicifacies* Giles 1901

Subgroup Funestus (Garros et al. 2004)

Anopheles aruni Sobti 1968
Anopheles confusus Evans & Leeson 1935
Anopheles funestus* Giles 1900
Anopheles funestus-like* Spillings et al 2009
Anopheles longipalpis Type C Koekemoer et al. 2009
Anopheles parensis Gillies 1962
Anopheles vaneedeni Gillies & Coetzee 1987

Subgroup Minimus (Chen et al. 2003)

Anopheles flavirostris* Ludlow 1914
Anopheles leesoni Evans 1931
Anopheles longipalpis Type A Koekemoer et al 2009

Complex Fluviatilis (Salara et al. 1993)

Anopheles fluviatilis* (species S, T, U, V) James 1902

Complex Minimus (Green et al. 1990)

Anopheles harrisoni Harbach & Manguin 2007
Anopheles minimusTheobald 1901

Subgroup Rivulorum (Garros et al 2004)

Anopheles brucei Service 1960
Anopheles fuscivenosus Leeson 1930
Anopheles rivulorum* Leeson 1935

Group Marshallii

Anopheles austenii Theobald 1905
Anopheles berghei Vincke & Leleup 1949
Anopheles brohieri Edwards 1929
Anopheles gibbinsi Evans 1935
Anopheles hancocki Edwards 1929
Anopheles hargreavesi Evans 1927
Anopheles harperi Evans 1936
Anopheles mortiauxi Edwards 1938
Anopheles mousinhoi de Meillon & Pereira 1940
Anopheles njombiensis Peters 1955
Anopheles seydeli Edwards 1929

Complex Marshalli (Gillies & Coetzee 1987)

Anopheles hughi Lambert & Coetzee 1982
Anopheles kosiensis Coetzee, Segerman & Hunt 1987
Anopheles letabensis Lambert & Coetzee 1982
Anopheles marshallii Theobald 1903

Group Wellcomei

Anopheles distinctus Newstead & Carter 1911
Anopheles erepens Gillies 1958
Anopheles theileri Edwards 1912
Anopheles wellcomei Theobald 1904

subspecies ugandae Evans 1934
subspecies ungujae White 1975
subspecies wellcomei Theobald 1904

Series Neocellia (Christophers 1924)

Anopheles ainshamsi Gad, Harbach & Harrison 2006
Anopheles dancalicus Corradetti 1939
Anopheles hervyi Brunhes, le Goff & Geoffroy 1999
Anopheles jamesiiTheobald 1901
Anopheles karwari* James 1903
Anopheles maculipalpis Giles 1902
Anopheles moghulensis Christophers 1924
Anopheles paltrinierii Shidrawi & Gillies 1988
Anopheles pattoni Christophers 1926
Anopheles pretoriensis Theobald 1903
Anopheles pulcherrimusTheobald 1902*
Anopheles rufipes Gough 1910

subspecies broussesi Edwards 1929
subspecies rufipes Gough 1910

Anopheles salbaii Maffi & Coluzzi 1958
Anopheles splendidus Koidzumi 1920
Anopheles theobaldi Giles 1901

Complex Stephensi

Anopheles stephensi* Liston 1901

Complex Superpictus

Anopheles superpictus* Grassi 1899

Group Annularis (Reid 1968)

Anopheles pallidus Theobald 1901
Anopheles philippinensis* Ludlow 1902
Anopheles schueffneri Stanton 1915

Complex Annularis (Reid 1968)

Anopheles annularis* van der Wulp 1884

Complex Nivipes (Green et al. 1985)

Anopheles nivipes Theobald 1903

Group Jamesii (Rattanarithikul et al. 2004)

Anopheles jamesii Theobald 1901
Anopheles pseudojamesi Strickland & Chowdhury 1927
Anopheles splendidus Koidzumi 1920

Group Maculatus (Rattanarithikul & Green 1987)

Anopheles dispar Rattanarithikul & Harbach 1991
Anopheles greeni Rattanarithikul & Harbach 1991
Anopheles pseudowillmori Theobald 1910
Anopheles rampaeHarbach & Somboon 2011
Anopheles willmori James 1903

Subgroup Maculatus (Rattanarithikul et al 2004)

Anopheles dravidicus Christophers 1924
Anopheles maculatus*

Subgroup Sawadwongporni (Rattanarithikul et al 2004)

Anopheles notanandai Rattanarithikul & Green 1987
Anopheles sawadwongporni Rattanarithikul & Green 1987

Series Neomyzomyia (Christophers 1924)

Anopheles amictus Edwards 1921

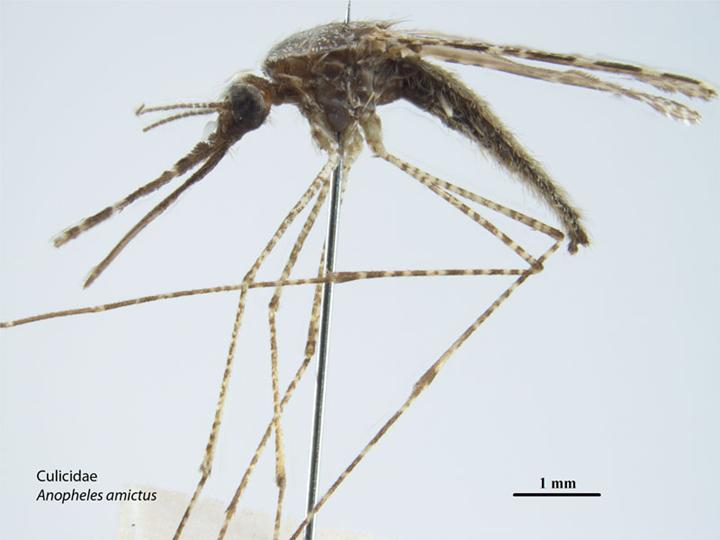
A. amictus

Anopheles annulatus Haga 1930
Anopheles aurirostris Watson 1910
Anopheles dualaensis Brunhes le Goff & Geoffroy 1999
Anopheles hilli Woodhill & Lee 1944
Anopheles incognitus Brug 1931
Anopheles kochi Dönitz 1901
Anopheles kokhani Vythilingam, Jeffery & Harbach 2007
Anopheles kolambuganensis Baisas 1932
Anopheles longirostris Brug 1928
Anopheles mascarensis de Meillon 1947
Anopheles meraukensis Venhuis 1932
Anopheles novaguinensis Venhuis 1933
Anopheles saungi Colless 1955
Anopheles stookesi Colless 1955
Anopheles watsonii Leicester 1908

Complex Annulipes

Anopheles annulipes Walker 1856

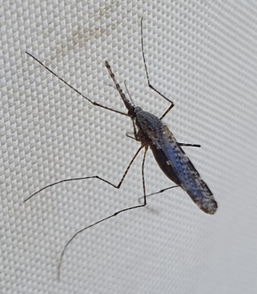
A. annulipes

Complex Lungae

Anopheles lungae Belkin & Schlosser 1944
Anopheles nataliae Belkin 1945
Anopheles solomonis Belkin, Knight & Rozeboom 1945

Complex Punctulatus

Anopheles clowi Rozeboom & Knight 1946
Anopheles farauti* Laveran 1902
Anopheles hinesorum Schmidt 2001
Anopheles irenicus Schmidt 2003
Anopheles koliensis Owen 1945
Anopheles punctulatus Dönitz 1901

Hosts: Bos taurus, Canis familiaris, Equus, Felis, Gallus

Anopheles torresiensis Schmidt 2001

Group Ardensis

Anopheles ardensis Theobald 1905
Anopheles buxtoni Service 1958
Anopheles cinctus Newstead & Carter 1910
Anopheles deemingi Service 1970
Anopheles eouzani Brunhes le Goff & Bousses 2003
Anopheles kingi Christophers 1923
Anopheles machardyi Edwards 1930
Anopheles maliensis Bailly-Choumara & Adam 1959
Anopheles millecampsi Lips 1960
Anopheles multicinctus Edwards 1930
Anopheles natalensis Hill & Haydon 1907
Anopheles vernus Gillies 1968
Anopheles vinckei de Meillon 1942

Complex Nili

Anopheles carnevalei Brunhes, le Geoff & Geoffrey 1999
Anopheles nili* Theobald 1904
Anopheles ovengensis Awono-Ambene Simard Antonio-Nkonkjio & Fontenille 2004
Anopheles somalicus Rivola & Holstein 1957

Group Kochi (Rattanarithikul et al 2004)

Anopheles kochi Donitz 1901

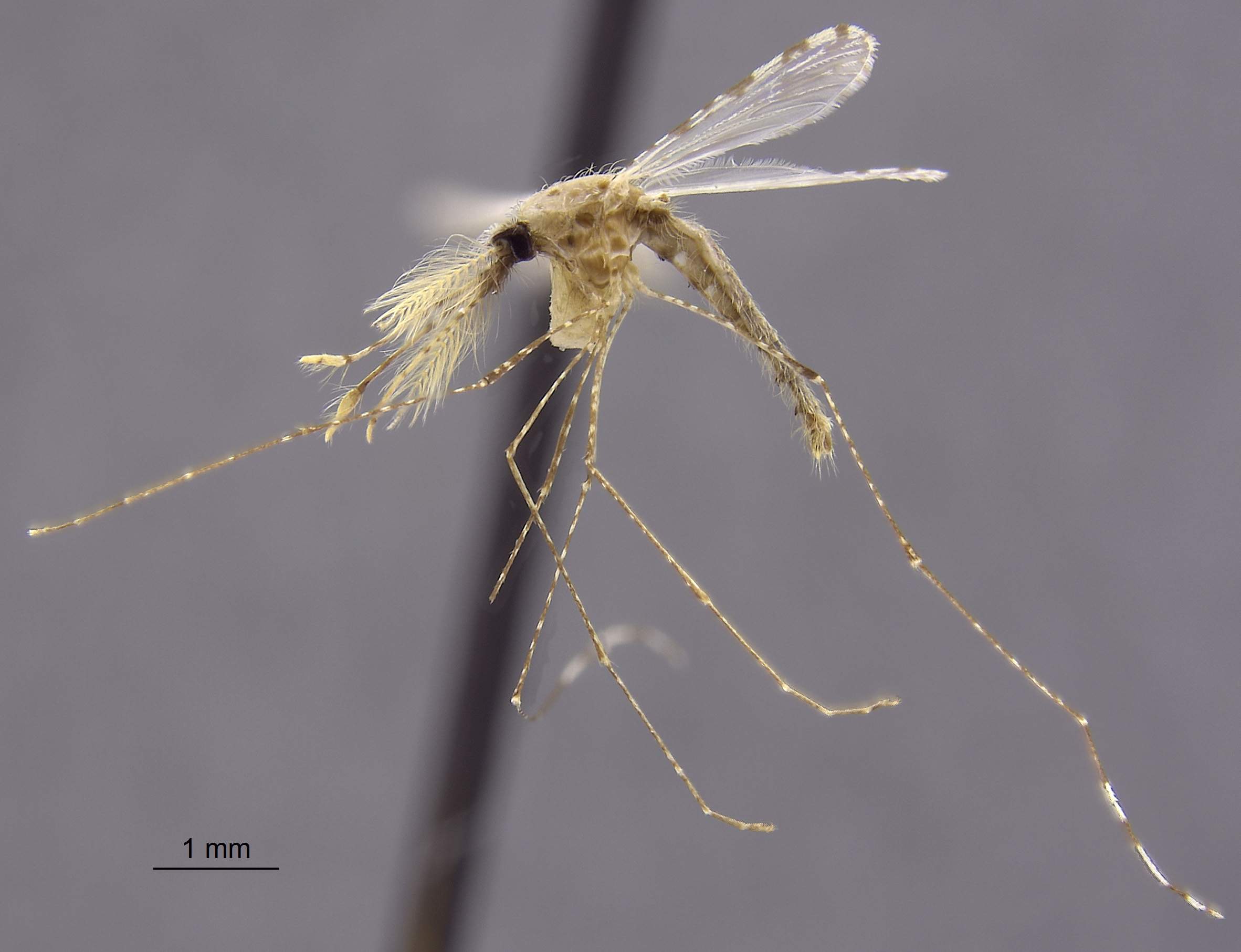
Preserved specimens of A. kochi

Group Leucosphyrus

Anopheles baisasi Colless 1957
Anopheles cristatus King & Baisas

Subgroup Elegans

Anopheles elegans James 1903

Subgroup Hackeri

Anopheles hackeri Edwards 1921
Anopheles mirans Sallum & Peyton 2005
Anopheles pujutensis Colless 1948
Anopheles recens Sallum & Peyton 2005
Anopheles sulawesi* Waktoedi 1954

Subgroup Leucosphyrus

Anopheles baimaii* Sallum & Peyton 2005
Anopheles cracens Sallum & Peyton 2005
Anopheles scanloni Sallum & Peyton 2005

Complex Dirus

Anopheles dirus* Peyton & Harrison 1979
Anopheles nemophilous Peyton & Ramalingam 1988
Anopheles takasagoensis Morishita 1946

Complex Leucosphyrus (Peyton 1990)

Anopheles balabacensis* Baisas 1936
Anopheles introlatus Colless 1957
Anopheles latens* Sallum & Peyton 2005
Anopheles leucosphyrus* Dönitz 1901

Subgroup Riparis (Peyton 1990)

Anopheles cristatus King & Baisas
Anopheles macarthuri Colless 1956
Anopheles riparis King & Baisas 1936

Group Tessellatus (Rattanarithikul et al 2004)

Anopheles tessellatus Theobald

subspecies A. t. kalawara Stoker & Waktoedi
subspecies A. t. orientalis Swellengrebel & Swellengrebel de Graaf
subspecies A. t. tessellatus Theobald

Series Paramyzomyia (Christophers & Barraud 1931)

Group Cinereus

Anopheles azevedoi Ribeiro 1969
Anopheles cinereus Theobald 1901

subspecies cinereus Theobald 1901
subspecies hispaniola Theobald 1903

Complex Turkhudi (Liston)

Anopheles turkhudi Liston 1901

subspecies telamali Saliternik & Theodor 1942
subspecies turkhudi Liston 1901

Group Listeri

Anopheles listeri de Mellion 1931
Anopheles multicolor* Cambouliu 1902
Anopheles seretsei Abdulla-Chan Coetzee & Hunt 1998

Series Pyretophorus (Blanchard 1902)

Anopheles christyi Newstead & Carter 1911
Anopheles daudi Coluzzi 1958
Anopheles indefinitus Ludlow 1904
Anopheles limosus King 1932
Anopheles litoralis King 1932
Anopheles ludlowae Theobald 1903

subspecies ludlowae Theobald 1903
subspecies torakala Stoker & Waktoedi 1949

Anopheles parangensis Ludlow 1914
Anopheles vagus* Dönitz 1902

Complex Gambiae (White 1985)

Anopheles amharicus Hunt, Wilkerson & Coetzee 2013
Anopheles arabiensis* Patton 1905
Anopheles bwambae White 1985
Anopheles coluzzii* Coetzee & Wilkerson 2013
Anopheles comorensis Brunhes le Goff & Geoffroy 1997
Anopheles fontenillei Barrón et al 2019
Anopheles gambiae* Giles 1902
Anopheles melas* Theobald 1903
Anopheles merus Dontiz 1902
Anopheles quadriannulatus Theobald 1911

Complex Subpictus (Sugana et al. 1994)

Anopheles subpictus* Grassi 1899

Complex Sundaicus (Sukowati 1999)

Anopheles epiroticus Linton & Harbach 2005
Anopheles sundaicus* Rodenwaldt 1925

=== Subgenus Kerteszia ===
Anopheles auyantepuiensis Harbach & Navarro 1996
Anopheles bambusicolus Komp 1937
Anopheles bellator* Dyar & Knab 1906
Anopheles boliviensis Theobald 1905
Anopheles cruzii* Dyar & Knab 1908
Anopheles gonzalezrinconesi Cova Garcia, Pulido & de Ugueto, 1977
Anopheles homunculus* Komp 1937
Anopheles laneanus Corrêa & Cerqueira 1944
Anopheles lepidotus Zavortink 1973
Anopheles neivai Howard, Dyar & Knab 1913
Anopheles pholidotus Zavortink 1973
Anopheles rollai Cova Garcia, Pulido & de Ugueto 1977

Note: Anopheles cruzii is known to be a species complex, but the number species in this complex has yet to be finalised.

=== Subgenus Lophopodomyia ===
Anopheles gilesi Peryassu 1928
Anopheles gomezdelatorrei Levi-Castillo 1955
Anopheles oiketorakras Osorno-Mesa 1947
Anopheles pseudotibiamaculata Galvao & Barretto 1941
Anopheles squamifemur Antunes 1937
Anopheles vargasi Gabaldon Cova Garcia & Lopez 1941

=== Subgenus Nyssorhynchus ===
Anopheles dominicanus Zavortinkb and Poinarab 2000

Section Albimanus
Anopheles noroestensis Galvao and Lane 1937

Series Albimanus (Faran 1980)

Anopheles albimanus* Weidemann 1820

Series Oswaldoi (Faran 1980)

Group Oswaldoi (Faran 1980)

Subgroup Oswaldoi (Faran 1980)

Anopheles anomalphyllus Komp
Anopheles aquasalis* Curry 1932
Anopheles dunhamii Causey 1945
Anopheles evansae Brethes 1926
Anopheles galvaoi Causey, Deane and Deane 1943
Anopheles ininii Sevenet & Abonnenc 1938
Anopheles konderi Galvfio & Damasceno 1942
Anopheles oswaldoi Peryassú 1922
Anopheles rangeli Galabadon, Cova-Garcia & Lopez 1941
Anopheles sanctielii Sevenet & Abonnenc 1938
Anopheles trinkae Faran 1980

Complex Nuneztovari (Conn et al. 1993)

Anopheles geoeldii Rozeboom and Gabaldón 1941
Anopheles nuneztovari* Galbadón 1940

Subgroup Strodei (Faran 1980)

Anopheles alberto
Anopheles arthuri*
Anopheles benarrochi Galabadon, Cova-Garcia & Lopez
Anopheles rondoni Neiva & Pinto 1922
Anopheles strodei Root 1926

Group Triannulatus

Anopheles halophylus do Nascimento & de Oliveira 2002
Anopheles triannulatus Neiva & Pinto 1922

Section Argyritarsis (Levi Castillo 1949)

Series Albitarsis

Anopheles rooti Brethes 1926

Group Albitarsis

Anopheles albitarsis
Anopheles deaneorum Rosa-Freitas 1989
Anopheles janconnae Wilkerson & Sallum 2009
Anopheles oryzalimnetes Wilkerson & Motoki 2009
Anopheles marajoara* Galvao & Damesceno 1942

Group Braziliensis

Anopheles braziliensis Chagas 1907

Series Argyritarsis

Group Argyritarsis

Anopheles argyitarsis Robineau-Desvoidy 1827
Anopheles sawyeri Causey, Deane, Deane & Sampaio 1943

Group Darlingi

Anopheles darlingi* Root

Group Lanie

Anopheles lanei Galvao & Amaral 1938

Group Pictipennis
Anopheles pictipennis Phillippi 1865

Section Myzorhynchella (Peyton et al. 1992)

Anopheles antunesi Galvao & Amaral 1940
Anopheles lutzii Cruz 1901
Anopheles nigritarsis Chagas 1907
Anopheles parvus Chagas 1907

=== Subgenus Stethomyia ===
Anopheles acanthotorynus Komp 1937
Anopheles canorii Floch & Abonnenc 1945
Anopheles kompi Edwards 1930
Anopheles nimbus
Anopheles thomasi Shannon 1933

== Notes ==
- Anopheles anthropophagus Xu and Feng is considered to be a junior synonym of Anopheles lesteri de Meillon 1931.
- Anopheles bonneorum Fonseca & Ramos is considered to be a synonym of Anopheles costai.
- Anopheles lewisi Ludlow 1920 is a synonym of Anopheles thomasi Shannon 1933.
- Anopheles lineata Lutz is a synonym of Anopheles nimbus Theobald.
- Anopheles mesopotamiae is considered to be a synonym of Anopheles hyrcanus.
- Anopheles rossii Giles 1899 was originally described as Anopheles subpictus Grassi 1899.
- Bironella derooki is a synonym of Anopheles soesiloi.

The following are currently regarded as nomina nuda:

- Anopheles (Anopheles) solomonensis Cumpston 1924
- Anopheles (Cellia) melanotarsis Woodhill & Lee

A subgroup of Anopheles gambiae sensu stricto has been reported and given the name Goundry. This subgroup has not yet been elevated to species status.
