= 1906 malaria outbreak in Ceylon =

Malaria outbreak in Ceylon

- Disease: Malaria
- Pathogen: Plasmodium sp.
- First outbreak: Ceylon
- Dates: early 20th Century to 1936
- Confirmed cases: more than 4 million (1934-1935)
- Deaths: 80,000 (1934-1935)
- Fatality rate: 2% (1935)

The 1906 malaria outbreak in Ceylon, was a major malaria outbreak in Ceylon during the early twentieth century. The first cases were reported in the early 1900s but not officially recorded until 1906. Malaria has been prevalent on the island since the 3rd century B.C. Malaria is caused by single-cell microorganisms of Plasmodium group. This disease is commonly spread by the female Anopheles mosquito. Most Anopheles mosquito species are native in Sri Lanka. There are four main mosquito species on the island including: Anopheles culicifacies, Anopheles subpictus, Anopheles annularis and Anopheles varuna.

== History ==
In pre-colony era there no written records of malaria-related cases in Sri Lanka. Early 13th century small details founded Polonnaruwa Kingdom (1056–1236) as recorded by Buddhist monks write in the chronicle Mahavams. There was no such record of malaria-related cases Anuradhapura Kingdom (377 BC–1017 AD) period but an unclear illness report found from Anuradhapura era written stone inscriptions in Sri Lanka. It never recognizes malaria-related illness. Under the Dutch colony period Dutch Ceylon (1640–1796) located Southern Province (exclude Hambanthota district) in the wet zone reported unknown disease spread. It is called kale una or forest fever. Because most illness reported near forest areas. First official record found in British Colonial period (1796–1948) malaria spread rapidly reaching a major epidemic in 1934 to 1935. It is called "The Great Malaria Epidemic". During that time estimated five million people infected with disease and approximately 80,000 people died. British Government launch project called Anti-Malaria campaign. It started in 1911 but effected in 1934. First Campaign launch located in Kurunagala District.
