= Anopheles subpictus =

Scientific classification
- Kingdom: Animalia
- Phylum: Arthropoda
- Class: Insecta
- Order: Diptera
- Family: Culicidae
- Genus: Anopheles
- Subgenus: Cellia
- Species: A. subpictus

Binomial name
- Anopheles subpictus (Grassi, 1899)

Synonyms
- Anopheles error Theobald, 1903; Anopheles rossii Giles, 1899

Species of mosquito

Anopheles (Cellia) subpictus is a species complex of four species (A, B, C and D) of mosquito belonging to the genus Anopheles.

== Subgenus classification ==
The genus Anopheles has been subdivided into seven subgenera – Anopheles, Baimaia, Cellia, Kerteszia, Lophopodomyia, Nyssorhynchus and Stethomyia – based primarily on the number and positions of specialized setae on the gonocoxites of the male genitalia. Within the subgenus but above the level of species a number of additional taxonomic ranks have been created. While not officially recognised they are in widespread use. The full classification of this species complex is:

- Subgenus Cellia
- Series Pyretophorus
- Complex Anopheles subpictus

== Bionomics ==
The larvae are typically found in fresh water or rainwater pools often near urban peripheries or rural houses. They are also found in barrow pits, buffalo wallows and artificial containers. Species B is the only species restricted to coastal brackish-water habitats. Species A, C, and D generally found in fresh-water sites.

== Geographic occurrence ==
It has been reported in nineteen countries of the Oriental and Australasian Zones and is an important vector of malaria in the Australasian Zone, Sulawesi, West Timor, South East Asia and Sri Lanka. It is most common anopheline in most parts of the Indian subcontinent and has a widespread distribution eastwards and southwards to Papua New Guinea, westwards to Iran and northwards to China.

It has been reported from Afghanistan, Bangladesh, Cambodia, China, India, Indonesia, Iran, Malaysia, Maldives, Mariana Islands, Myanmar, Nepal, Pakistan, Papua New Guinea, Philippines, Sri Lanka and Thailand.

== Medical importance ==
In addition to its role as a vector of malaria it is also a vector of some helminths (including Wuchereria bancrofti) and arboviruses (including Japanese encephalitis virus, Sindbis virus and West Nile virus). It has also been shown to transmit seadornaviruses but the importance of this observation is not yet clear.
