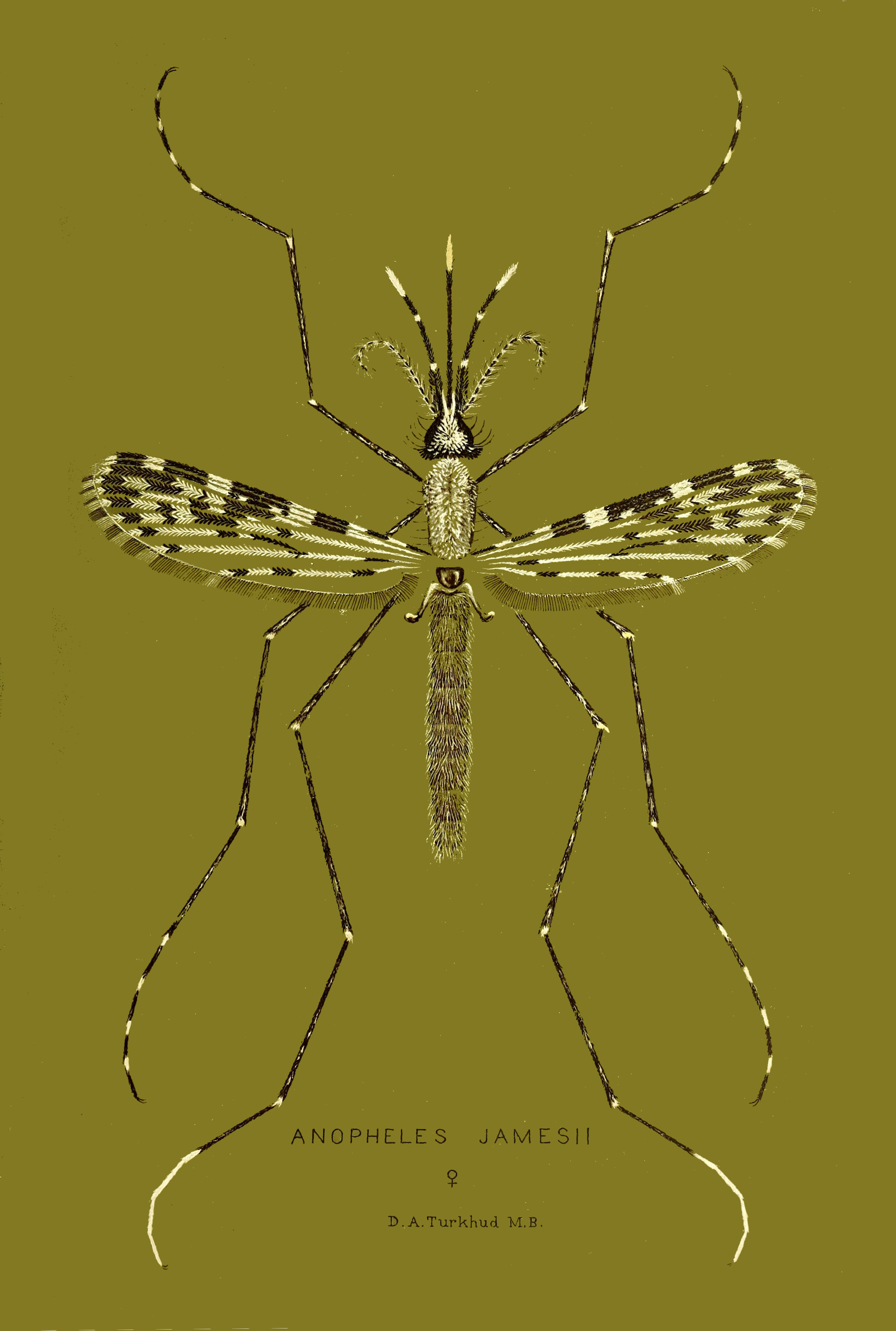

Scientific classification
- Kingdom: Animalia
- Phylum: Arthropoda
- Class: Insecta
- Order: Diptera
- Family: Culicidae
- Genus: Anopheles
- Subgenus: Cellia
- Species: A. jamesii

Binomial name
- Anopheles jamesii Theobald, 1901

= Anopheles jamesii =

Species complex of mosquito

Anopheles (Cellia) jamesii is a species complex of mosquito belonging to the genus Anopheles. It is found in India, and Sri Lanka, Bangladesh, Cambodia, China, Laos, Malaysia, Myanmar, Nepal, Thailand, and Vietnam. It is a potential natural vector of bancroftian filariasis in Sri Lanka.

The species is named after the malariologist S.P. James.
