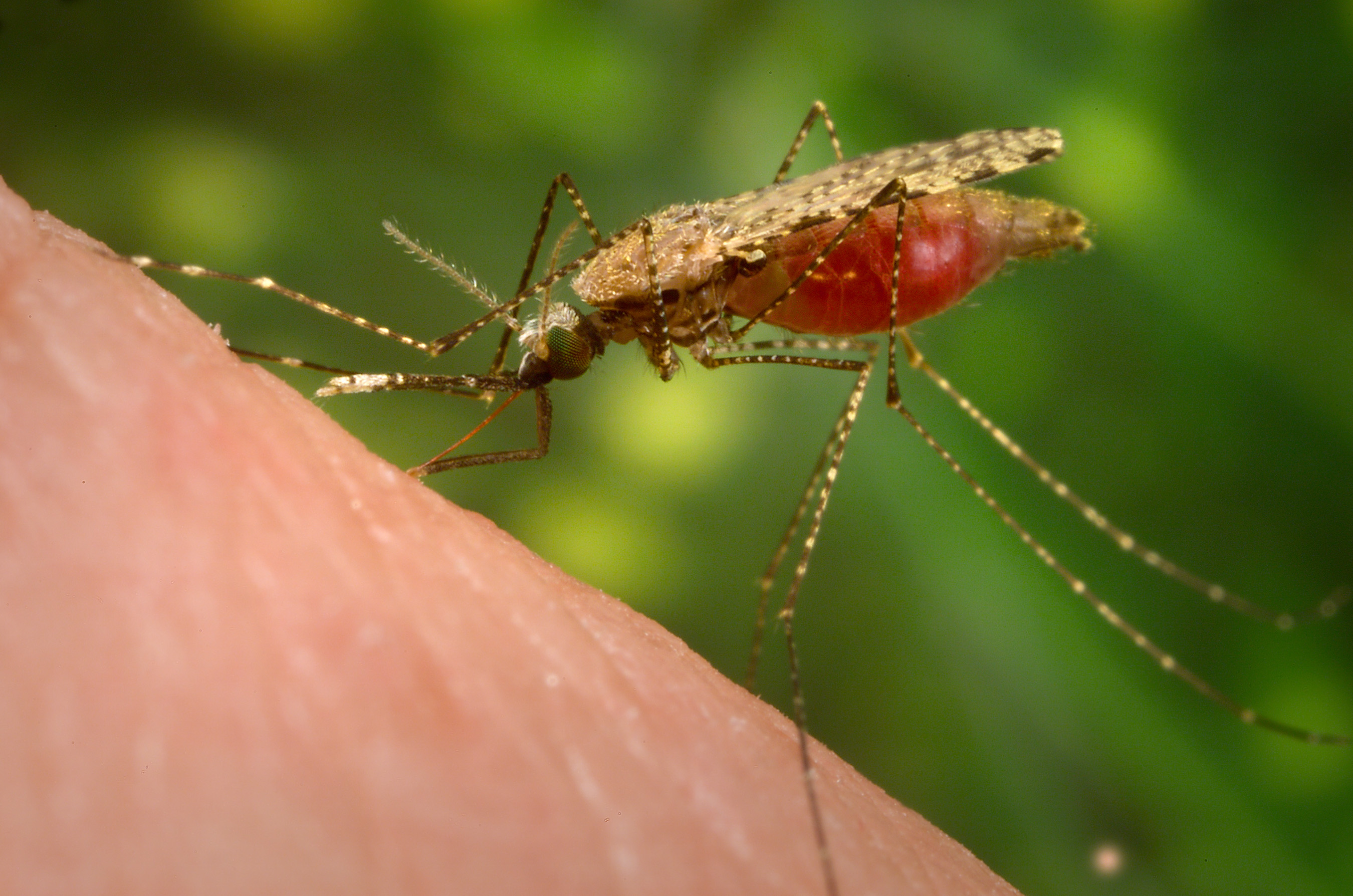

Scientific classification
- Kingdom: Animalia
- Phylum: Arthropoda
- Class: Insecta
- Order: Diptera
- Family: Culicidae
- Genus: Anopheles
- Subgenus: Cellia
- Species: A. farauti

Binomial name
- Anopheles farauti Laveran, 1902

= Anopheles farauti =

Species of mosquito

Anopheles farauti is a species of mosquito that is an important malaria vector occurring in Papua New Guinea, neighbouring islands and Australia. A. farauti is common in coastal areas and breeds in brackish water rich in organic matter. It is often found in coastal swamps and mangrove forests.
