= Anopheles aconitus =

Scientific classification
- Kingdom: Animalia
- Phylum: Arthropoda
- Class: Insecta
- Order: Diptera
- Family: Culicidae
- Genus: Anopheles
- Subgenus: Cellia
- Species: A. aconitus

Binomial name
- Anopheles aconitus Dönitz, 1902

Species of mosquito

Anopheles aconitus is a species of mosquito belonging to the genus Anopheles. It is mostly found in uplands generally restricted to below 1000m. Eggs are laid and larvae can be found in paddy fields and shallow pools. Females are primarily zoophilic, where bovids are primary hosts and humans are alternate hosts.
