= Anopheles pallidus =

Scientific classification
- Kingdom: Animalia
- Phylum: Arthropoda
- Class: Insecta
- Order: Diptera
- Family: Culicidae
- Genus: Anopheles
- Subgenus: Cellia
- Species: A. pallidus

Binomial name
- Anopheles pallidus Theobald, 1901

Species complex of mosquito

Anopheles pallidus is a species complex of mosquito belonging to the genus Anopheles. It is found in India, and Sri Lanka and Myanmar. It is a potential natural vector of bancroftian filariasis in Sri Lanka as well as Malaria and Babesiosis in other countries.
