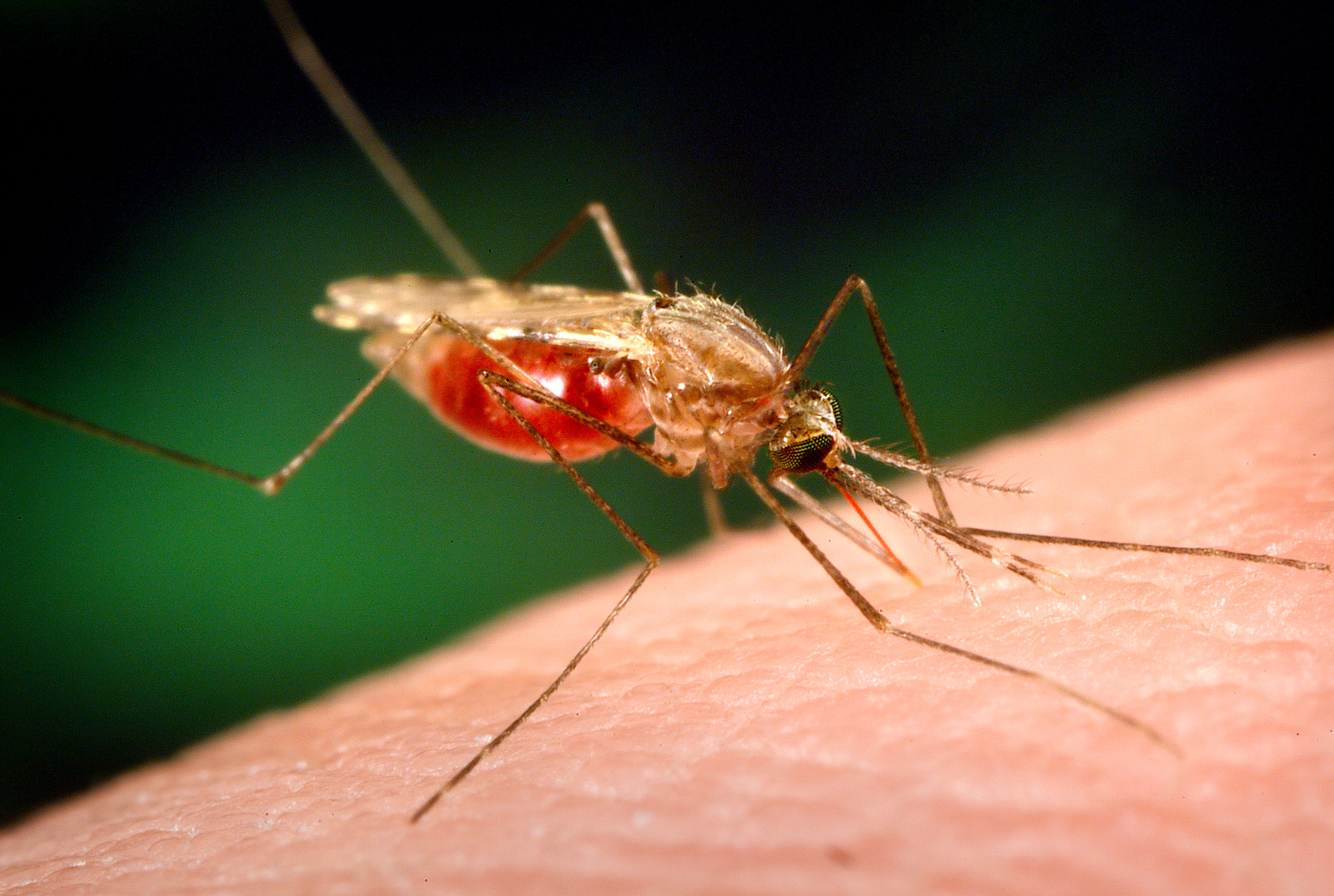

Scientific classification
- Kingdom: Animalia
- Phylum: Arthropoda
- Clade: Pancrustacea
- Class: Insecta
- Order: Diptera
- Family: Culicidae
- Genus: Anopheles
- Subgenus: Cellia
- Species: A. funestus

Binomial name
- Anopheles funestus Giles, 1900

= Anopheles funestus =

Species of insect

Anopheles funestus is a species of mosquito in the Culicidae family. This species was first described in 1900 by Giles. The female is attracted to houses where it seeks out humans in order to feed on their blood, mostly during the night. This mosquito is a major vector of malaria in sub-Saharan Africa.

== Distribution and habitat ==
Anopheles funestus is found in tropical sub-Saharan Africa, its range extending from Senegal to Ethiopia, Angola, South Africa and Madagascar. Breeding takes place in water, any permanent or semi-permanent body of fresh water with some emergent vegetation being suitable, including swamps, lake verges, ponds and rice paddies. The larvae inhabit both sunlit and shaded locations, the vegetation probably being effective in reducing predation. In the Sahel, increased aridity has moved the northern limit of its range southward by about 100 km (62 mi). Although it is considered to be a single species, part of a species complex, it shows some anomalies of behaviour across its range. It is present in the paddy fields of Madagascar but not in those of West Africa; it used to breed in fast-moving streams in South Africa before being largely eliminated by the use of insecticides, but when it became re-established there via Mozambique, it bred in swamps. It is present in mountainous areas of East Africa at altitudes of up to 2,000 m (6,600 ft) but is largely absent from forests.

== Behaviour ==
The female mosquito lays a raft of eggs on the surface of water. The larval and pupal stages of the life cycle take place under water, but after metamorphosis, adults of both sexes leave the water and visit flowers to feed on nectar. Before it starts to breed, the female mosquito needs a meal of vertebrate blood to provide the protein it needs for egg production; the male does not bite. The adult female Anopheles funestus is "anthropophilic", being attracted to people rather than to other animals; however this is not invariably the case, as in Senegal, the populations of this mosquito in the west of the country feed on human blood while those in the east favour that of other mammals (zoophilic). It is also "endophilic" in its behaviour; this means it is attracted to the inside of human habitations, both when feeding and when resting. It feeds at night, typically after 10 p.m. and usually between midnight and dawn, which gives it access to widely dispersed hosts in a non-alert state.

== Vector ==
Anopheles funestus is an efficient vector of the Plasmodium parasites that cause malaria in humans. This is because of its endophilic and anthropophilic characteristics, and because the adult insect is relatively long-lived.

== Insecticide resistance ==
This is a highly adaptable species and many populations have developed resistance to pyrethroid insecticides, resulting in an upsurge of malarial infections in sub-Saharan Africa in the 1990s. A. funestus has widespread resistance to DDT and pyrethroids in Southern and West Africa, and in the Tororo District of Uganda in the east of the continent. The Tororo population was, however, entirely susceptible to bendiocarb, malathion, and dieldrin.
