= Anopheles daciae =

Scientific classification
- Kingdom: Animalia
- Phylum: Arthropoda
- Clade: Pancrustacea
- Class: Insecta
- Order: Diptera
- Family: Culicidae
- Genus: Anopheles
- Subgenus: Anopheles
- Species: A. daciae

Binomial name
- Anopheles daciae Linton, Nicolescu & Harbach, 2004

Species of mosquito

Anopheles daciae is a species of mosquito that belongs to the Anhopheles maculipennis complex. Other species of this complex include Anopheles messeae, which can only be distinguished from Anopheles daciae by DNA analysis.

== Distribution ==
The species was first described from Romania, but has since been found in Belgium, Croatia, Finland, Germany, Great Britain, Poland, Russia, Serbia, and Sweden.

== Taxonomic placement ==
Ever since it was described, An. daciae was the subject of scientific debate about its existence due to the very small differences between An. daciae and An. messeae. While results from Romania and Great Britain supported the two-species hypothesis, studies from Italy and Russia disputed this. Two studies from Russia and Sweden, which analyzed the DNA with more advanced methods, could finally determine that An. daciae is indeed a species on its own.
