= Anopheles karwari =

Scientific classification
- Kingdom: Animalia
- Phylum: Arthropoda
- Class: Insecta
- Order: Diptera
- Family: Culicidae
- Genus: Anopheles
- Subgenus: Cellia
- Species: A. karwari

Binomial name
- Anopheles karwari James, 1903

Species of mosquito

Anopheles (Cellia) karwari is a species complex of zoophilic mosquito belonging to the genus Anopheles. It is found in India, and Sri Lanka, Bangladesh, Sumatra, and Java. A. karwari is a member of the Maculatus Group and the second scarcest species reported from Indonesia. Female is blood sucking and involved in transmitting Plasmodium falciparum, thus an important malarial vector. It is considered a secondary vector in the Australian region, but its vectorial status in South-East Asia was unknown.

== Ecology ==
The species is found from both natural and man-made shady areas including marshes, small, slow-moving streams, seepages, ground and rock pools, springs, and rice fields.
