= Anopheles nuneztovari =

Scientific classification
- Domain: Eukaryota
- Kingdom: Animalia
- Phylum: Arthropoda
- Class: Insecta
- Order: Diptera
- Family: Culicidae
- Genus: Anopheles
- Subgenus: Anopheles (Nyssorhynchus)
- Species: A. nuneztovari

Binomial name
- Anopheles nuneztovari Gabaldón, 1940

Species of mosquito

Anopheles nuneztovari is a species of mosquito in the order Diptera native to South America. The species was named by its discoverer, Arnoldo Gabaldón, to honor the Venezuelan entomologist Manuel Núñez Tovar.

== Distribution ==
Anopheles nuneztovari has been collected in Bolivia, Brazil, Colombia, French Guiana, Guyana, Panama, Peru, Suriname, and Venezuela.

== Bionomics ==
The larvae and other juvenile stages of An. nuneztovari have been collected in fresh water exposed to full sun or in partial shade in marshy areas, ponds and lakes, permanent or temporary ground pools, tracks of animals and wheels, and along stream margins. Adult An. nuneztovari mosquitoes have been found in the interior of forests, in clearings within the forest, and in areas of secondary growth such as around villages. Their occurrence near villages increases their importance as vectors of human disease.

== Medical importance ==
Anopheles nuneztovari is a primary vector of malaria in western Venezuela and northern Colombia, and a probable vector in Suriname. An. nuneztovari has not been reported to be an important vector of malaria in the Amazon basin.
