= Anopheles elegans =

Scientific classification
- Kingdom: Animalia
- Phylum: Arthropoda
- Clade: Pancrustacea
- Class: Insecta
- Order: Diptera
- Family: Culicidae
- Genus: Anopheles
- Subgenus: Cellia
- Species: A. elegans

Binomial name
- Anopheles elegans (James, 1903)

Species complex of mosquito

Anopheles elegans is a species complex of mosquito belonging to the genus Anopheles. It is found in India and Sri Lanka. In India, it is known to breed in shaded stagnant waters and tree holes. It is a natural vector of simian malaria in both countries.
