= Arnoldo Gabaldón =

Venezuelan physician and politician (1909–1990)

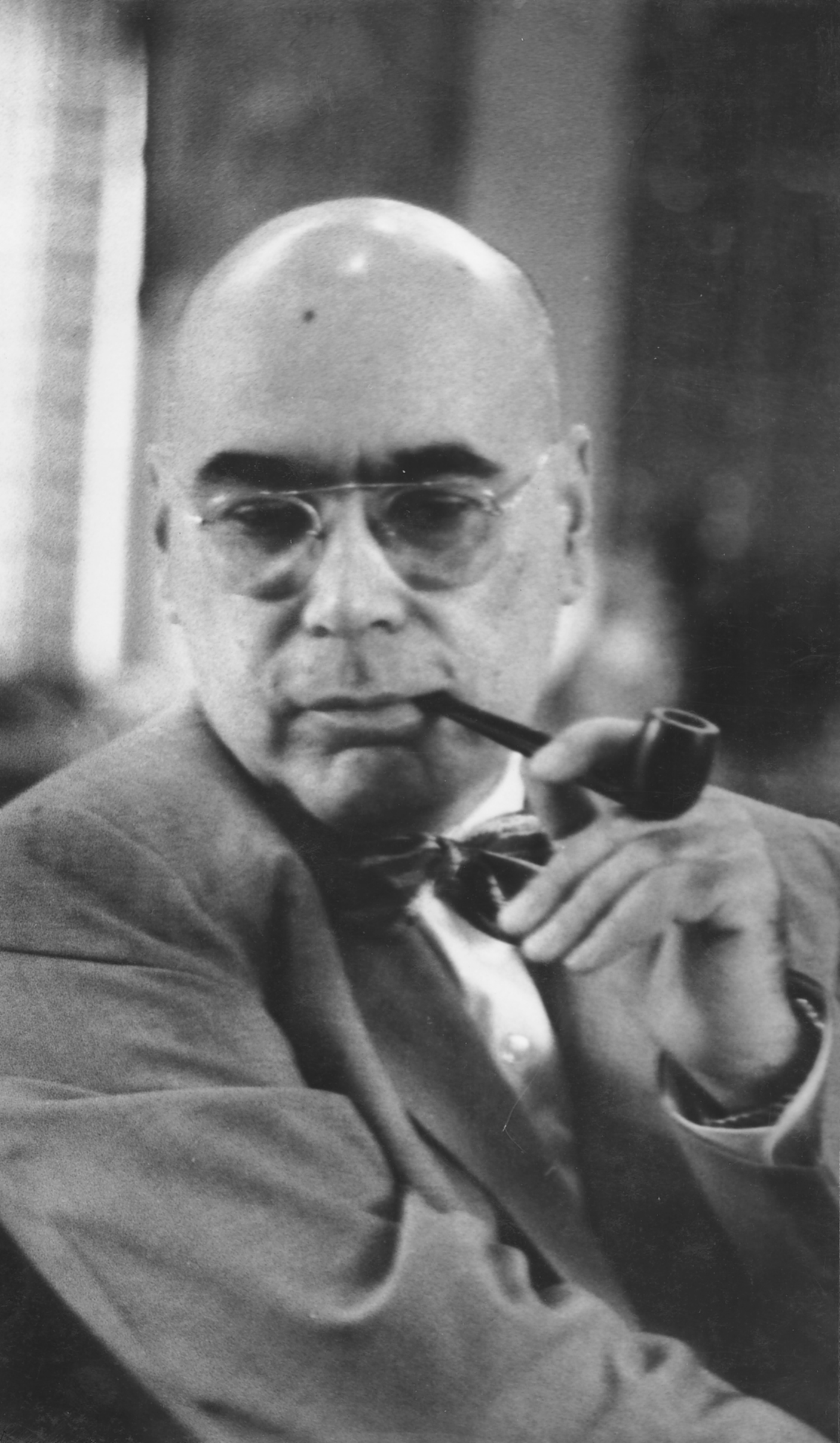

Minister of Health and Social Welfare of Venezuela
- In office 13 February 1959 – 10 March 1964
- President: Rómulo Betancourt
- Preceded by: Espíritu Santos Mendoza
- Succeeded by: Alfredo Arreaza Guzmán

Personal details
- Born: Arnoldo Gabaldón Carrillo; 1 March 1909 Trujillo, Trujillo, Venezuela
- Died: 1 September 1990 (aged 81) Caracas, Venezuela
- Party: Unaffiliated
- Spouse: María Teresa Berti
- Children: Arnoldo José Gabaldón Berti
- Education: Central University of Venezuela; Johns Hopkins University

Arnoldo Gabaldón Carrillo (1 March 1909 in Trujillo, Trujillo State – 1 September 1990 in Caracas) was a physician, researcher and Venezuelan politician. He is recognized for his activism against malaria. His campaign against the disease reduced the number of cases in Venezuela to almost zero during the 1950s, giving place to more exploitable territory and population growth.

== Biography ==
Arnoldo Gabaldón was born on 1 March 1909, in the Andean city of Trujillo in Venezuela, son of Joaquin Gabaldón and Virginia Carrillo Márquez. He graduated from the undergraduate in philosophy in 1928 and in 1930 earned a doctorate in medical sciences at the Universidad Central de Venezuela. Then he completed a specialty at the Institute for Maritime and Tropical Diseases in Hamburg in Hamburg (Germany), subsequently traveling to the United States in 1935 as a fellow of the Rockefeller Foundation to obtain a doctorate from Johns Hopkins University in hygiene sciences with a speciality in protozoology. Back in Venezuela he was appointed to head the newly created Special Directorate of Malariology within the Ministry of Health and Welfare, a position he held until 1950.

Under the direction of Gabaldón, Venezuela became the first state which organized a nationwide campaign against malaria using DDT, which led to the first eradication of the disease in a large tropical area.

Gabaldón gained such fame in his country that in 1951 he was one of the candidates to replace the recently assassinated President of the Republic, Carlos Delgado Chalbaud. He continued to advise the General Directorate of Malariology until his retirement in 1973.

== Health and welfare ==
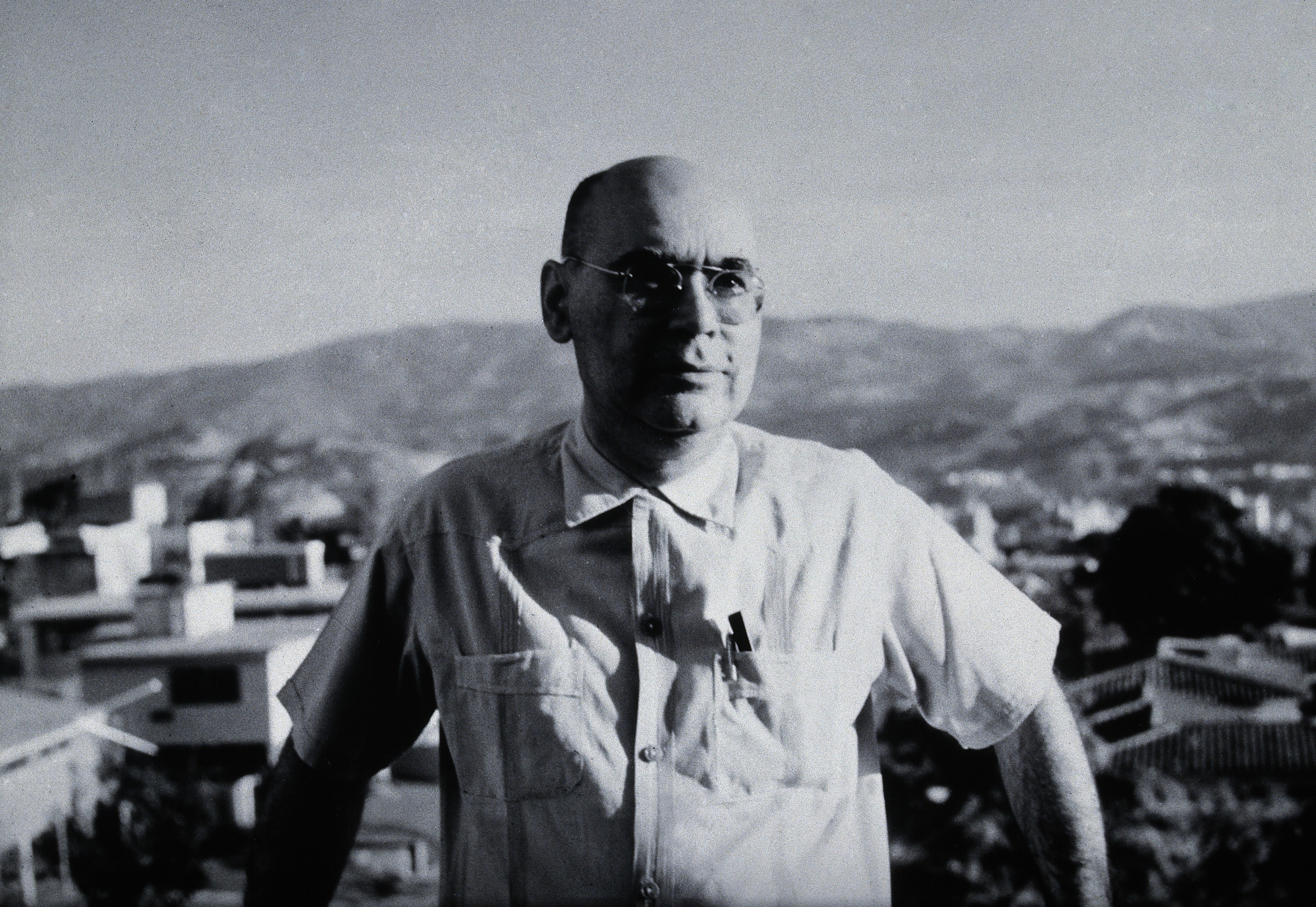
Arnoldo Gabaldon

In 1936 the Minister of Health and Welfare, Santos Dominici appointed Gabaldón director of Malariology and Alberto J. Fernandez, deputy director of the School of Malariology Experts malariologists. Once the headquarters of the National Division of Malaria in Maracay was established, Gabaldón carefully selected collaborators and as a team faced the serious problem of malaria in the country, by adopting a strategy that broke with the traditional schemes of the time, and it is still in full force, diligently preparing the staff and with defined methodologies according to the needs, accompanying the process of epidemiological research and disease control with antibacterial and antiparasitic measures. His strategy for antimalarial effort, was based on practical experiences of sanitation and supply of antimalarial drugs, with deep knowledge of national geopolitics and contact with people, becoming a national project, which immediately started to give positive results, so that high rates of morbidity and mortality malaria that decimated the country in the era of the 1930s, by 1944 had decreased significantly and its control was seen as possible.

This initial program in 1945 was followed by a phase of malaria eradication, through a national campaign by application of the synthetic insecticide dichlorodiphenyltrichloroethane better known as (DDT). The controversial use of DDT in Venezuela was carried out in a controlled manner through the work of the Italian-Venezuelan chemical Ettore Mazzarri, founder of the Chemical Laboratory of Malaria in 1948. The results were immediate: by 1950 the death rate from malaria in the country had been reduced to 9 per 100,000 inhabitants (from a Latin American country high of 164 per 100,000) and was eradicated in an area of 132 000 km2. In 1955, 10 years after the program started the rate was lowered to 1 per 100 000 population and the eradicated area had increased to 305,414 km2. Moron, an area that had the highest rates of mortality from malaria, had spent three years with no deaths by malaria. Thereafter the great population explosion in Venezuela occurred with evident achievements and successes which were recognized nationally and internationally.

He also discovered new species of malarial parasites and devoted himself to studying the mosquito Anopheles nuneztovari, action that catalyzed the recognition of educational needs and preparing managerial staff of the Ministry of Health, through the creation of the school that bears his name in Maracay, a deep and additional contribution.

Between 1959 and 1964 President Rómulo Betancourt appointed him Minister of Health and Welfare and Gabaldón developed a management program influenced by his professional background grounded in medical and environmental sanitation activities throughout the country.

At the Ministry, Arnoldo Gabaldón applied the same management principles that he had used for successful management in the Division of Malaria: the accuracy of objectives was one of his cardinal rules such as the one made when taking his new position: "Our objective in the field public health is to get a six-month increase in life expectancy at birth for each year of work "(Guerrero and Borges, 1998, 85).

Other significant elements of its successful management included; the selection of competent personnel and professionalization of the same both domestically and abroad, modernization of the management of different departments. His vision on the need for training or preparation for an efficient work in the field of malariology is expressed in his book "A Health Policy" and the "Letters of the Minister" which allowed him to disclose monthly to all staff and the country their views; He gave priority to preventive medicine for which he created the Environmental sanitation sub-department in 1960. He amended the health budget by investing more resources in environmental sanitation. He encouraged decentralization by signing agreements with regional governments to "cooperative services". It strengthened its longstanding goal of rural housing, in order to offer a decent habitat for the Venezuelan peasant.

Gabaldón authored more than 200 papers published in national and international medical journals written in Spanish, English, French and German. For example, he conducted studies on malaria in birds, work that earned him be incorporated as member of the Academy of Physical, Mathematical and Natural which in his honor institutionalized Arnoldo Gabaldón Prize for scientists under 40 years in the areas Biology, Physics, Chemistry and Mathematics. It was also a tenured of the National Academy of Medicine, where he held the chair X joining in 1972.

He was the first professor of the Simón Bolívar Professor of Latin-American Studies at the University of Cambridge, England (1968–69) and directed post-doctoral studies at the Central University of Venezuela.

Gabaldón was active as an expert of the World Health Organization in work for malaria control in countries from 5 continents. On February 15, 1989, it was decided by Venezuelan executive decree, on the eightieth anniversary of his birth, to compile his written work, to issue a postage stamp with his effigy and to give his name to the complex of buildings that would form the Directorate of Malaria and Environmental Sanitation in Maracay, today known as the Institute of Higher Studies of Malariology Arnoldo Gabaldón. Gabaldón Parish in the Candelaria municipality of his native state, was named in his honor.

== Personal life ==
On 22 April 1937, in Boconó Trujillo state, he married María Teresa Berti, sister of one of his great friends and exemplary fighter against malaria in Venezuela Arturo Luis Berti. His son Arnoldo José Gabaldón (Caracas, 1938) was the first Minister of Environment of Latin America (1976–79) and chairman of the board of the United Nations Environment Programme (UNEP) at its nineteenth period session, Nairobi, Kenya, 1997–99, member of the Academy of Physical, Mathematical and Natural Sciences (2007), rector of the Presidential Commission for State Reform, head of the Venezuelan delegation to the Environmental Summit in Rio 1992 and general manager of the environmental consulting firm Ecology & Environment of Venezuela. His nephew engineer Adalberto Gabaldón was environment minister in the transitional government of President Ramón J. Velásquez between 1993 and 1994.

== See also ==
- Los Notables
