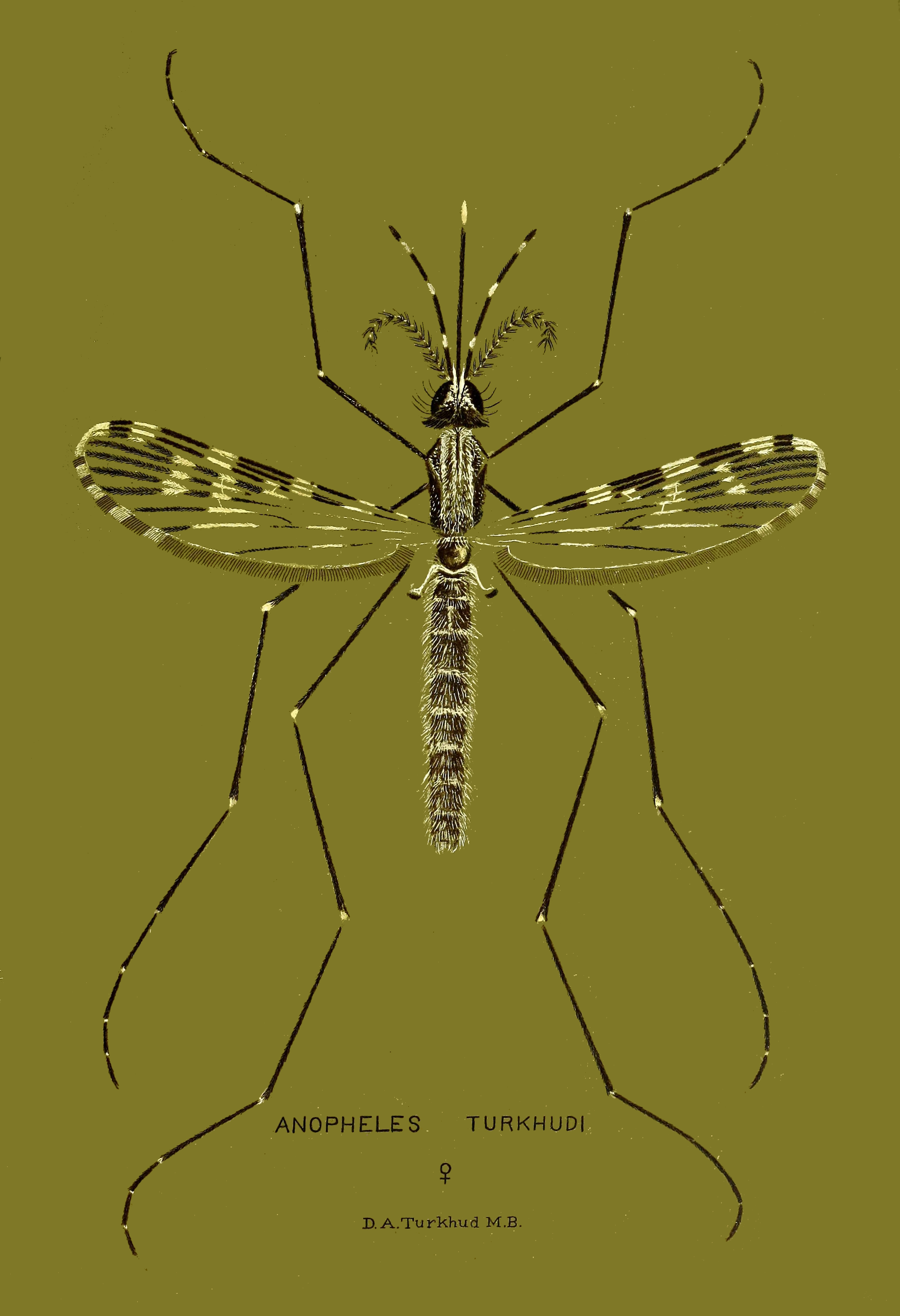

Scientific classification
- Kingdom: Animalia
- Phylum: Arthropoda
- Clade: Pancrustacea
- Class: Insecta
- Order: Diptera
- Family: Culicidae
- Genus: Anopheles
- Subgenus: Cellia
- Species: A. turkhudi

Binomial name
- Anopheles turkhudi Liston 1901

Synonyms
- Anopheles flaviceps Edwards, 1921; Anopheles azriki Patton, 1905; Anopheles persicus Edwards, 1921; Anopheles amutis de Burca, 1943

= Anopheles turkhudi =

Species of mosquito

Anopheles turkhudi is a species of mosquito in the genus Anopheles. Larvae are found in river beds, rock pools and water holes. Adults have been reported to bite humans.

Under experimental conditions, A. turkhudi has proven to be able to develop and carry malarial pathogens, but it hasn't been found infected naturally.

== Description ==
The head of adult A. turkhudi is with a yellowish integument, and with many light brown bristles between the eyes. Basal point of antennae is yellow in colour, females with few small scales on the second joint. Female palpi are slightly longer than the black proboscis, narrow whitish rings at the tips of the first three joints. The light-yellowish thorax is slightly darker in females than males, a somewhat shiny mesonotum with light bristles. Abdomen light brown, with narrow dark bands in the males. Legs and wings mostly dark.

Larvae lack palmate hairs on the first three abdominal segments, and therefore rest slanted at the water's surface.

Eggs of A. turkhudi differ from other Anopheles species as they lack floats.

== Subspecies ==
There are two accepted subspecies of Anopheles turkhudi, namely A. t. turkhudi and A. t. telamali. The former is found in Israel, while the latter has a wider distribution of Afghanistan, Algeria, Bangladesh, Djibouti, Egypt, Eritrea, Ethiopia, India, Iran, Iraq, Israel, Jordan, Morocco, Nepal, Pakistan, Saudi Arabia, Somalia, Sudan and Yemen.
