= Anopheles belenrae =

Scientific classification
- Kingdom: Animalia
- Phylum: Arthropoda
- Class: Insecta
- Order: Diptera
- Family: Culicidae
- Genus: Anopheles
- Subgenus: Anopheles
- Species: A. belenrae

Binomial name
- Anopheles belenrae Rueda, 2005

Species of mosquito

Anopheles belenrae is a species of mosquito. It is found in South Korea.
