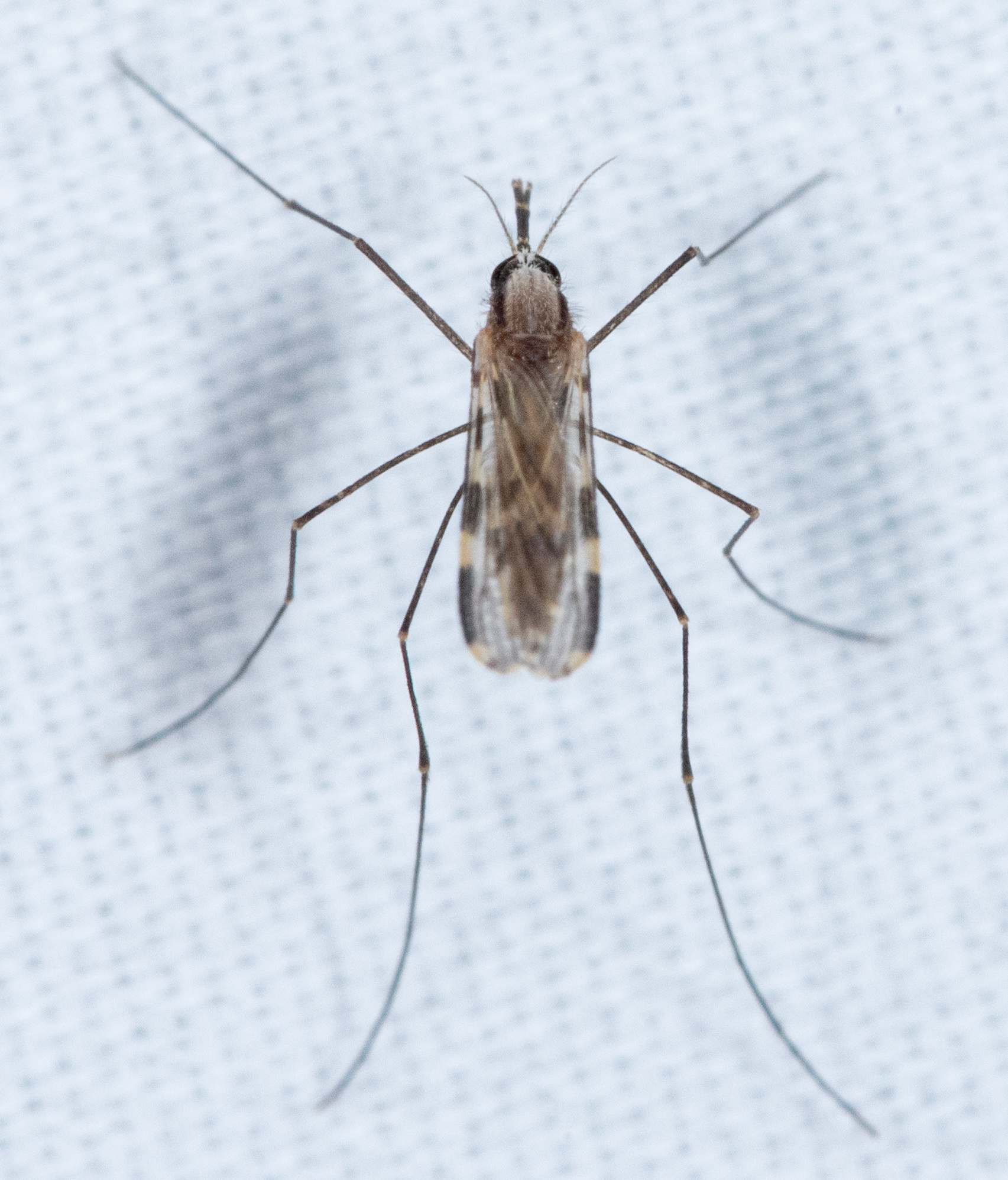

Scientific classification
- Kingdom: Animalia
- Phylum: Arthropoda
- Class: Insecta
- Order: Diptera
- Family: Culicidae
- Genus: Anopheles
- Subgenus: Anopheles
- Species: A. franciscanus

Binomial name
- Anopheles franciscanus Mccracken, 1904

Synonyms
- Anopheles boydi Vargas, 1939

= Anopheles franciscanus =

Species of mosquito

Anopheles franciscanus is a species of mosquito in the family Culicidae. This species has been collected in southern California.

== Subspecies ==
These seven subspecies belong to the species Anopheles franciscanus:

- Anopheles franciscanus bifoliata Osorno-m. & Munoz-s., 1948
- Anopheles franciscanus franciscanus Mc Cracken, 1904
- Anopheles franciscanus levicastilloi Levi-castillo, 1944
- Anopheles franciscanus neghmei Mann, 1950
- Anopheles franciscanus noei Mann, 1950
- Anopheles franciscanus patersoni Alvarado & Heredia, 1947
- Anopheles franciscanus rivadeneirai Levi-castillo, 1945
