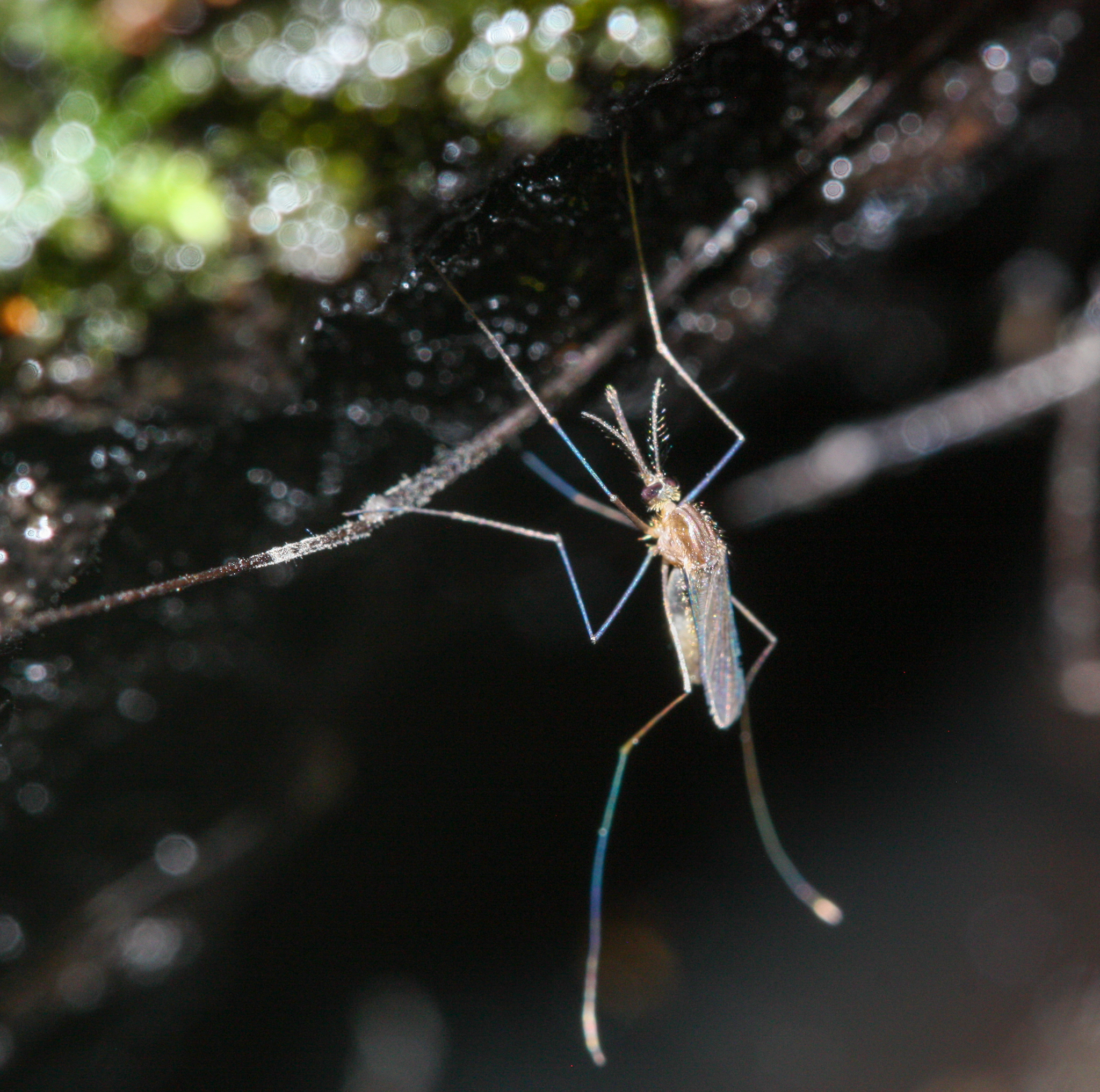

Scientific classification
- Kingdom: Animalia
- Phylum: Arthropoda
- Class: Insecta
- Order: Diptera
- Family: Culicidae
- Genus: Anopheles
- Subgenus: Anopheles
- Species: A. barberi

Binomial name
- Anopheles barberi Coquillett, D.W., 1903

= Anopheles barberi =

Species of mosquito

Anopheles barberi is a species of tree hole–breeding mosquito from eastern North America. The larvae are predators of other mosquito larvae, such as those of Aedes triseriatus. It has been shown to be a vector of malaria in the laboratory, but it is not thought to be an important malaria vector in the wild.
