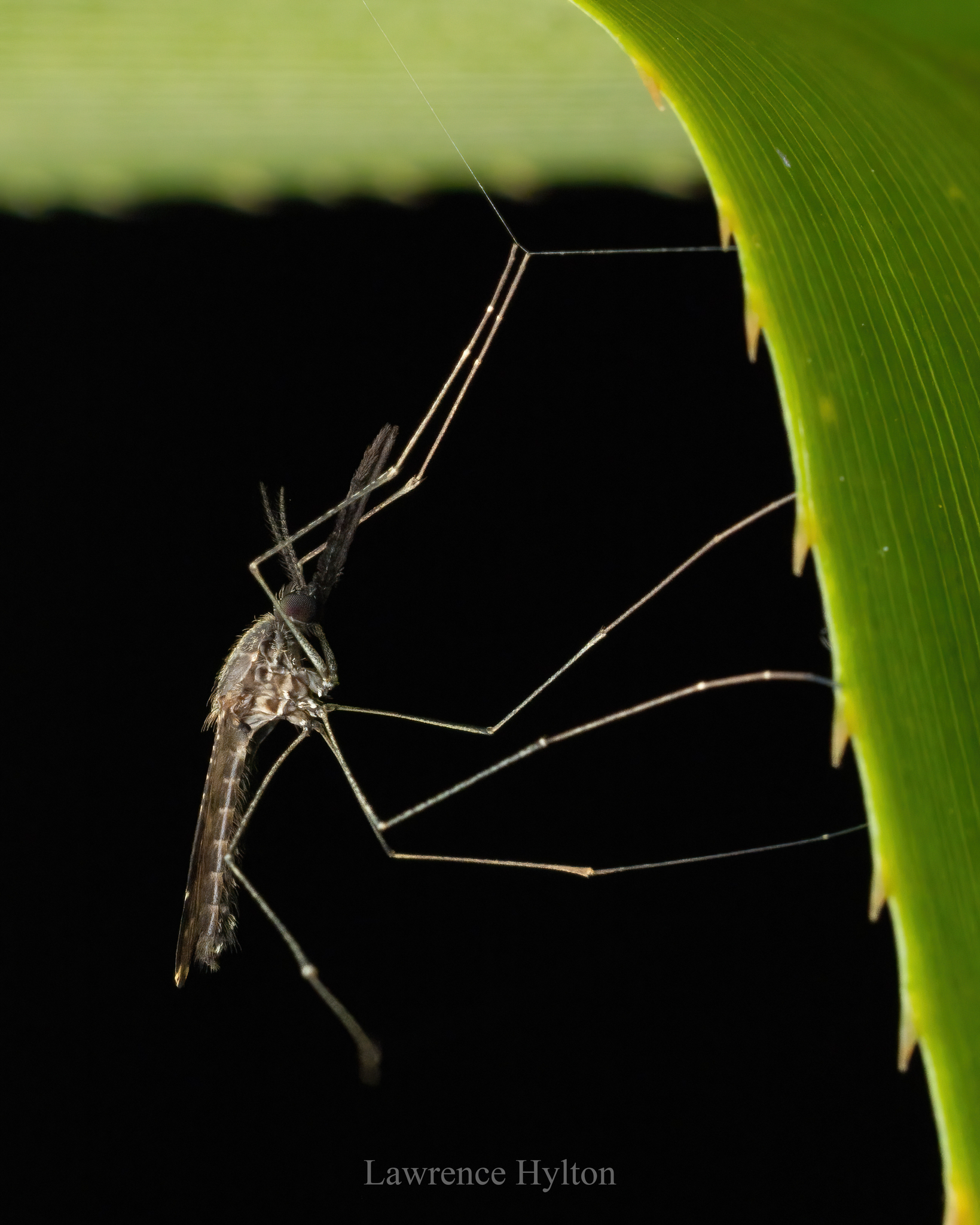

Scientific classification
- Kingdom: Animalia
- Phylum: Arthropoda
- Class: Insecta
- Order: Diptera
- Family: Culicidae
- Genus: Anopheles
- Subgenus: Anopheles
- Species: A. bancroftii

Binomial name
- Anopheles bancroftii Giles 1902

Subspecies
- A. b. bancroftii; A. b. barbiventris

= Anopheles bancroftii =

Species of mosquito

Anopheles bancroftii is a species of mosquito in the genus Anopheles. Adults breed in shaded freshwater swamps, commonly among reeds. They bite humans, along with other mammals and birds. Although they are found throughout the year, the highest numbers occur between May and November.

This mosquito is found in Western Australia, Northern Territory and Queensland. In 2017, it was located in New Caledonia, which was previously considered without Anopheles mosquitoes and malaria-free.

== Description ==
A large species, about 7 mm in length. Head is mostly black, torus with black scales. Palps are dark brown/black, and same with the proboscis. Scutum is a dark grey, sternites with white patches. Wings are black with a small white costa spot.

== Relation to disease ==
A. bancroftii is considered to be a secondary vector of malaria and is a known vector of filariasis. Three arboviruses, namely Kunijn, Koongol, and Bovine Ephemeral Fever virus have been isolated from this species.
