= Anopheles anthropophagus =

Scientific classification
- Kingdom: Animalia
- Phylum: Arthropoda
- Class: Insecta
- Order: Diptera
- Family: Culicidae
- Genus: Anopheles
- Subgenus: Anopheles
- Species: A. anthropophagus

Binomial name
- Anopheles anthropophagus Xu & Feng, 1975

Species of mosquito

Anopheles anthropophagus is a species of mosquito belonging to the genus Anopheles.
