= Anopheles varuna =

Scientific classification
- Kingdom: Animalia
- Phylum: Arthropoda
- Class: Insecta
- Order: Diptera
- Family: Culicidae
- Genus: Anopheles
- Subgenus: Cellia
- Species: A. varuna

Binomial name
- Anopheles varuna Iyengar, 1924

Species of mosquito

Anopheles (Cellia) varuna is a species complex of zoophilic mosquito belonging to the genus Anopheles. It is found in India, Sri Lanka Thailand and Vietnam. It is a secondary malaria vector in Sri Lanka. Larvae are known to feed on detritus, rod and cocci bacteria, diatom, filamentous algae and desmids. A microsporidium Thelohania obscura was discovered from the larvae in India in 1966.
