= Anopheles barianensis =

Scientific classification
- Kingdom: Animalia
- Phylum: Arthropoda
- Class: Insecta
- Order: Diptera
- Family: Culicidae
- Genus: Anopheles
- Subgenus: Anopheles
- Species: A. barianensis

Binomial name
- Anopheles barianensis James, 1911

Species of mosquito

Anopheles barianensis is species of mosquito from Anopheles genus, described by James in 1911. According to Catalogue of Life Anopheles barianensis don't have known subspecies.
