= Anopheles stigmaticus =

Scientific classification
- Kingdom: Animalia
- Phylum: Arthropoda
- Class: Insecta
- Order: Diptera
- Family: Culicidae
- Genus: Anopheles
- Species: A. stigmaticus

Binomial name
- Anopheles stigmaticus Skuse 1889

Species of mosquito

Anopheles stigmaticus is a species of mosquito in the genus Anopheles. It breeds in cold, clean water shaded by trees, and is confined to mountainous regions in eastern Australia. Its range was thought to extend into New Guinea, but larvae of New Guinean A. stigmaticus showed it to be of a different species.

It is not known to bite humans, but does feed on some marsupials, and can oviposit after a human bloodmeal.

== Description ==
A. stigmaticus is dark brown, with dark wings and legs, save the hind femur, which is largely pale scaled. Vertex with light golden upright scales. Palps, which are as long as proboscis in males, and slightly shorter in females, and proboscis are both dark brown. Scutum light gold in colour.

There are two larval forms, one of which is characterised by having a black longitudinal stripe along the dorsal thorax and abdomen, the other of which lacks this stripe, and is a uniform brown in colour.
