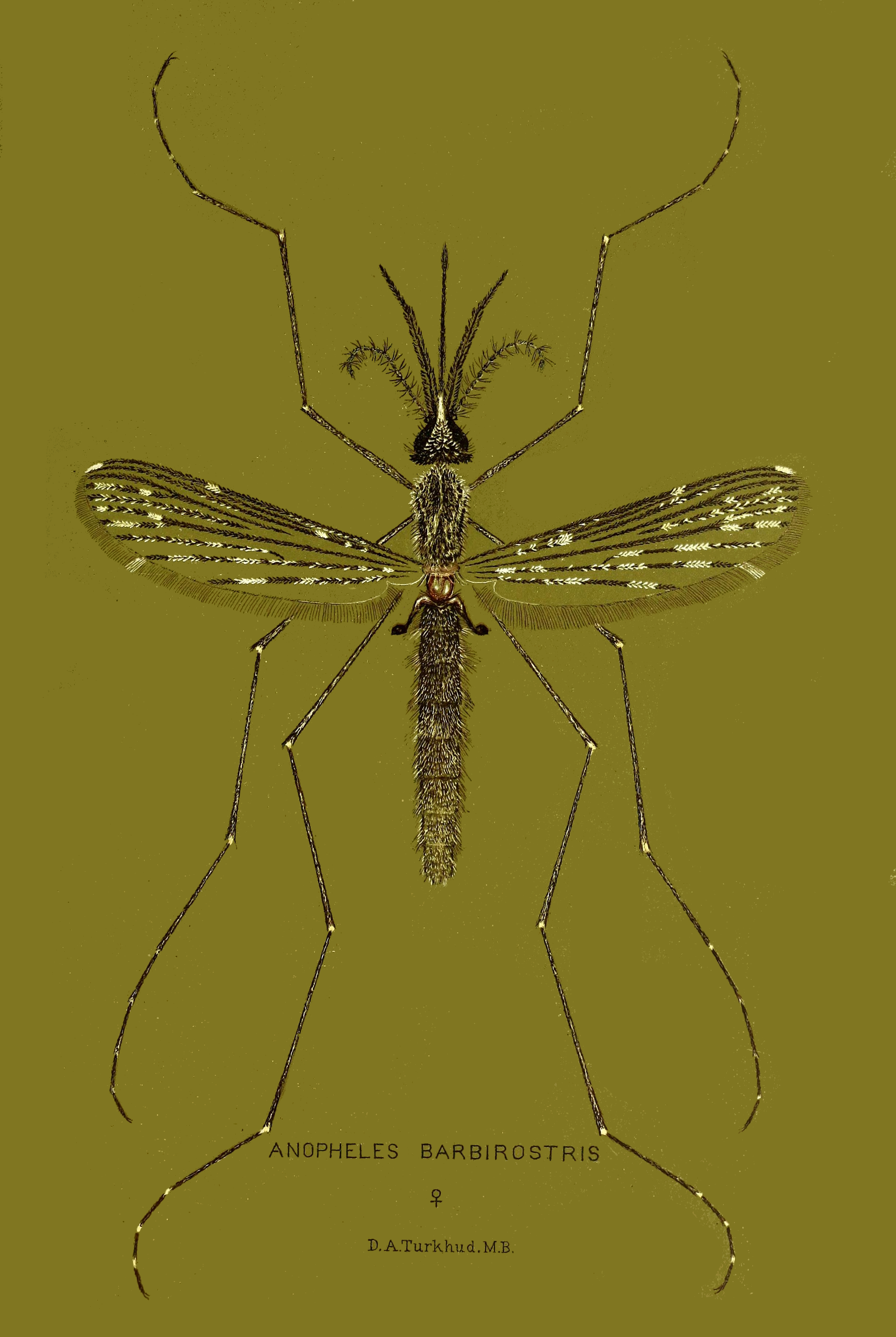

Scientific classification
- Kingdom: Animalia
- Phylum: Arthropoda
- Class: Insecta
- Order: Diptera
- Family: Culicidae
- Genus: Anopheles
- Subgenus: Anopheles
- Species: A. barbirostris

Binomial name
- Anopheles barbirostris van der Wulp, 1884

= Anopheles barbirostris =

Species of mosquito

Anopheles barbirostris is a species complex of mosquito belonging to the genus Anopheles. Larvae found in clean, lotic bodies of water. Females are zoophilic, mainly feed blood on cattle and humans. It is also an important vector for Plasmodium falciparum in Sri Lanka and Timor, for both Plasmodium vivax and P. falciparum in Bangladesh.
