= Anopheles bellator =

Scientific classification
- Kingdom: Animalia
- Phylum: Arthropoda
- Class: Insecta
- Order: Diptera
- Family: Culicidae
- Genus: Anopheles
- Subgenus: Kerteszia
- Species: A. bellator

Binomial name
- Anopheles bellator Dyar and Knab, 1906

Species of mosquito

Anopheles bellator is a species of mosquito mainly located in southeast of State of São Paulo, Brazil, is a main vector of malaria.
