= Anopheles atratipes =

Scientific classification
- Kingdom: Animalia
- Phylum: Arthropoda
- Class: Insecta
- Order: Diptera
- Family: Culicidae
- Genus: Anopheles
- Subgenus: Anopheles
- Species: A. atratipes

Binomial name
- Anopheles atratipes Skuse, 1889

Species of mosquito

Anopheles atratipes is an uncommon species of mosquito in the genus Anopheles. Larvae are found in paperbark swamps, in shaded areas. Adults are known to be active from October to February, biting during the day. The type locality is Berowra, a suburb in Sydney, New South Wales, Australia, although it is also found in other parts of Australia.

== Description ==
Adults are medium sized, averaging 4.18 mm in length, and dark in colour. Pale scales on the vertex and frons, broad dark scales on the sides of the head. Palp is dark black, and the same length as the long, dark proboscis. Antennae is 1.77 mm in length. Scutum mainly bare, grey with a few dark areas. Legs are dark, pale below on femora and tibiae. Minimal long white patches on veins on the wings.
