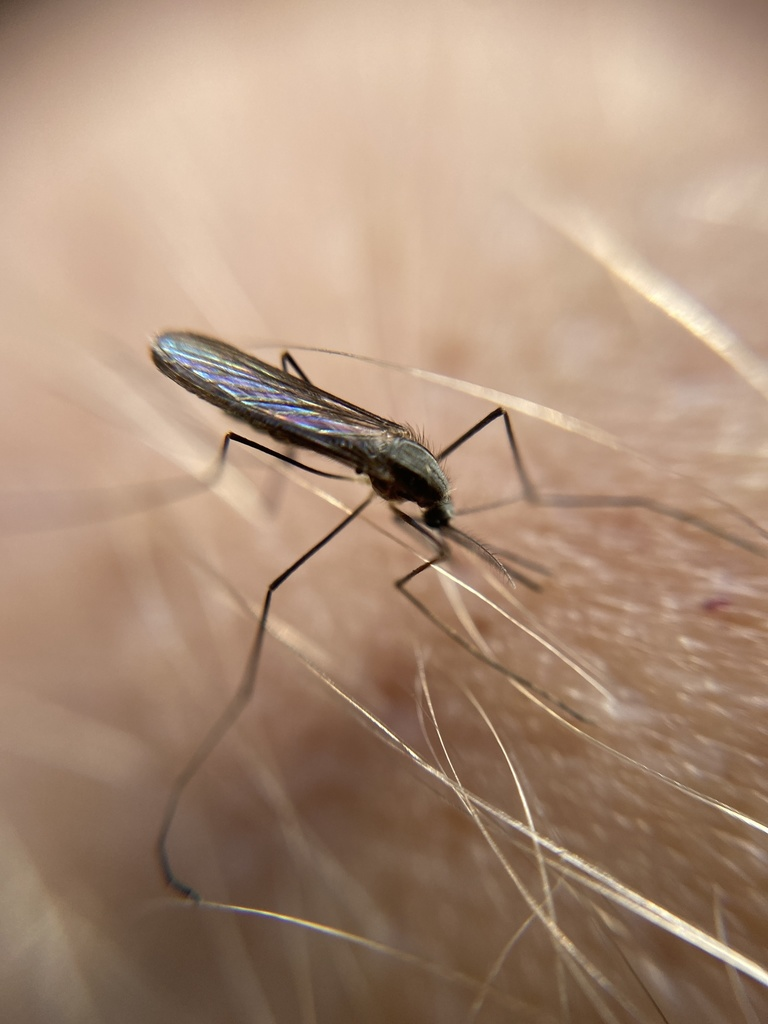

Scientific classification
- Kingdom: Animalia
- Phylum: Arthropoda
- Class: Insecta
- Order: Diptera
- Family: Culicidae
- Genus: Anopheles
- Subgenus: Anopheles
- Species: A. plumbeus

Binomial name
- Anopheles plumbeus Stephens, 1828

= Anopheles plumbeus =

Species of mosquito

Anopheles plumbeus is a species of mosquito found in Europe and can also be found in the near East and northern Africa. It is anthropophilic and can be a nuisance mosquito, biting persistently during dawn, dusk and also during the day. A. plumbeus can transmit the malaria agent Plasmodium falciparum. A. plumbeus has been collected from forested areas, but also from rural and urban areas. It breeds in treeholes, water-filled containers or discarded tyres. The species is similar in appearance to A. claviger.
