= Anopheles cruzii =

Scientific classification
- Kingdom: Animalia
- Phylum: Arthropoda
- Clade: Pancrustacea
- Class: Insecta
- Order: Diptera
- Family: Culicidae
- Genus: Anopheles
- Subgenus: Kerteszia
- Species: A. cruzii

Binomial name
- Anopheles cruzii Dyar and Knab, 1908

Species of mosquito

Anopheles cruzii is the species of mosquito that mainly located in southern coast of Brazil, is main vector of malaria, Plasmodium vivax.

It has been going through microevolution, which appears in its wing-shape and is correlated with urbanization.
