= Anopheles (Kerteszia) =

Scientific classification
- Domain: Eukaryota
- Kingdom: Animalia
- Phylum: Arthropoda
- Class: Insecta
- Order: Diptera
- Family: Culicidae
- Genus: Anopheles
- Subgenus: Kerteszia; Theobald, 1905

Subgenus of Neotropical anopheline mosquitoes

The subgenus Kerteszia are Neotropical anopheline mosquitoes originally described in 1905 by Frederick V. Theobald as genus Kertészia with Kertészia boliviensis as the type species.

== Bionomics ==
Subgenus Kerteszia immatures develop primarily in the water in bromeliads, and less often in bamboo. They are distributed southward from the State of Veracruz in Mexico through Central America and Atlantic South America, along the coast to Misiones Province in Argentina and Rio Grande do Sul in Brazil, and on the Pacific coast of South America to El Oro Province, Ecuador. The subgenus is absent from the West Indies islands except Trinidad and from most of the Amazon basin in South America.

== Medical importance ==
Several species of this subgenus are important primary vectors of human malarias, and other species are suspected vectors.

== Species ==
Species listed by the Walter Reed Biosystematics Unit:

- Anopheles auyantepuiensis Harbach and Navarro
- Anopheles bambusicolus Komp
- Anopheles bellator Dyar and Knab (syn.: Anopheles bromelicola Dyar)
- Anopheles boliviensis (Theobald)
- Anopheles cruzii Dyar and Knab (syn.: Anopheles adolphoi Neiva, Anopheles lutzii Theobald, Anopheles montemor Correa)
- Anopheles gonzalezrinconesi Cova García, Pulido F. & Escalante de Ugueto
- Anopheles homunculus Komp (syn.: Anopheles anoplus Komp)
- Anopheles laneanus Corrêa & Cerqueira
- Anopheles lepidotus Zavortink
- Anopheles neivai Howard, Dyar and Knab (syn.: Anopheles hylephilus Dyar and Knab)
- Anopheles pholidotus Zavortink
- Anopheles rollai Cova García, Pulido F. & Escalante de Ugueto (syn.: Anopheles hilli Cova Garcia, Pulido and de Ugueto)
