= Anopheles (Stethomyia) =

Scientific classification
- Domain: Eukaryota
- Kingdom: Animalia
- Phylum: Arthropoda
- Class: Insecta
- Order: Diptera
- Family: Culicidae
- Genus: Anopheles
- Subgenus: Stethomyia; Edwards, 1932

Type species
- Anopheles nimbus Theobald, 1902

Species
- Anopheles acanthotorynus Anopheles canorii Anopheles kompi Anopheles nimbus Anopheles thomasi

Subgenus of mosquitoes

Stethomyia is a subgenus of the mosquito genus Anopheles. The type species is Anopheles nimbus. There are five species in this subgenus.

== History ==
This subgenus was described by Frederick Wallace Edwards in 1932.

== Phylogeny ==
Of the seven extant subgenera of Anopheles, Stethomyia appears to be the earliest diverging clade.

This branching order is currently under examination and may be revised.

== Distribution ==
This subgenus is found in the Caribbean and both Central and South America.

Countries where species of this subgenus are found include: Bolivia, Brazil, Costa Rica, Colombia, French Guiana, Guyana, Panama, Peru, Suriname, Trinidad and Tobago and Venezuela.

The species in this subgenus are forest mosquitoes and to date have been poorly studied. Larvae and pupal forms have been found in shaded marshy and swampy areas along streams within forests. Adult females are known to feed on humans.

== Description ==
Eggs:

Larvae:

- Widely separated seta 2-C
- The long pleural setae have thornlike branches on one side only
- Abdominal setae 1 are vestigial or absent
- Anterolateral spiracular lobes have a narrow finger-like process
- Spiracles are prominent and widely spaced

Pupae:

Pupae do not seem to bear subgeneric characters.

Adults:

These species are all dark mosquitoes and lack pale scaling on the maxillary palpi, wings or legs found in other species.

They have a median longitudinal silvery stripe on the scutum and lack prealar setae.

Male genitalia gonocoxites have an internal seta and a single long parabasal seta that is not borne on a tubercle.

== Medical importance ==
None of the species in this genus transmit malaria.
