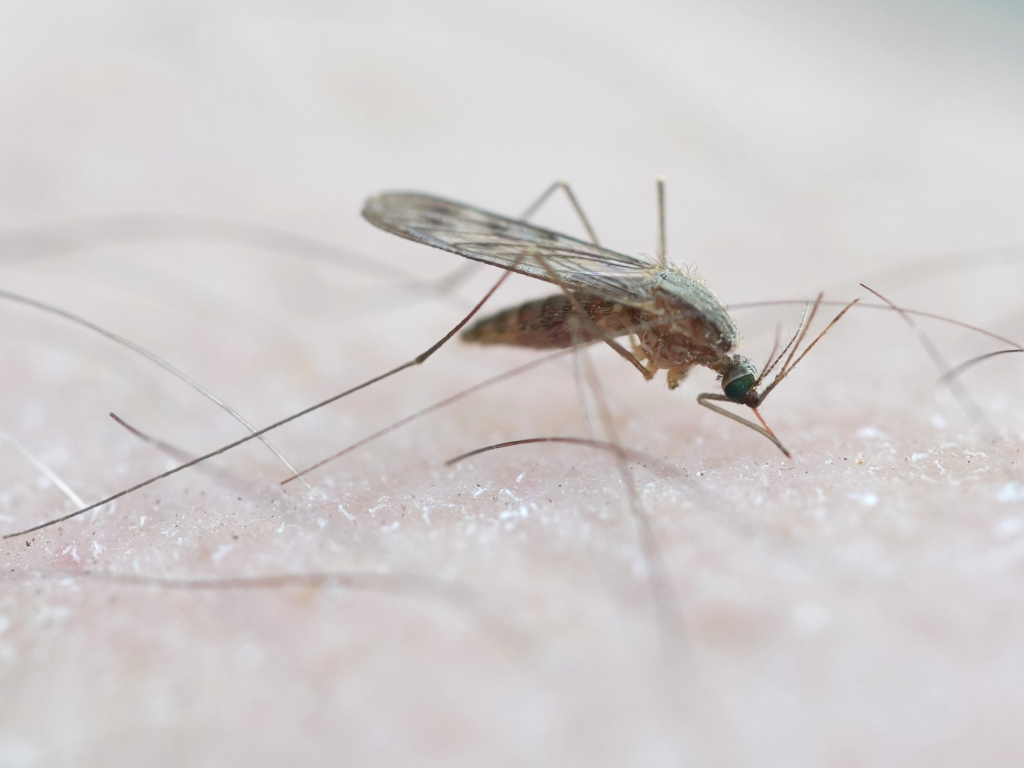

Scientific classification
- Kingdom: Animalia
- Phylum: Arthropoda
- Class: Insecta
- Order: Diptera
- Family: Culicidae
- Genus: Anopheles
- Subgenus: Anopheles
- Species: A. maculipennis

Binomial name
- Anopheles maculipennis Meigen, 1818

= Anopheles maculipennis =

Species of mosquito

Anopheles maculipennis is a species of mosquito that can be found mostly in Europe and New Zealand. It is one of the main vectors of malaria.
