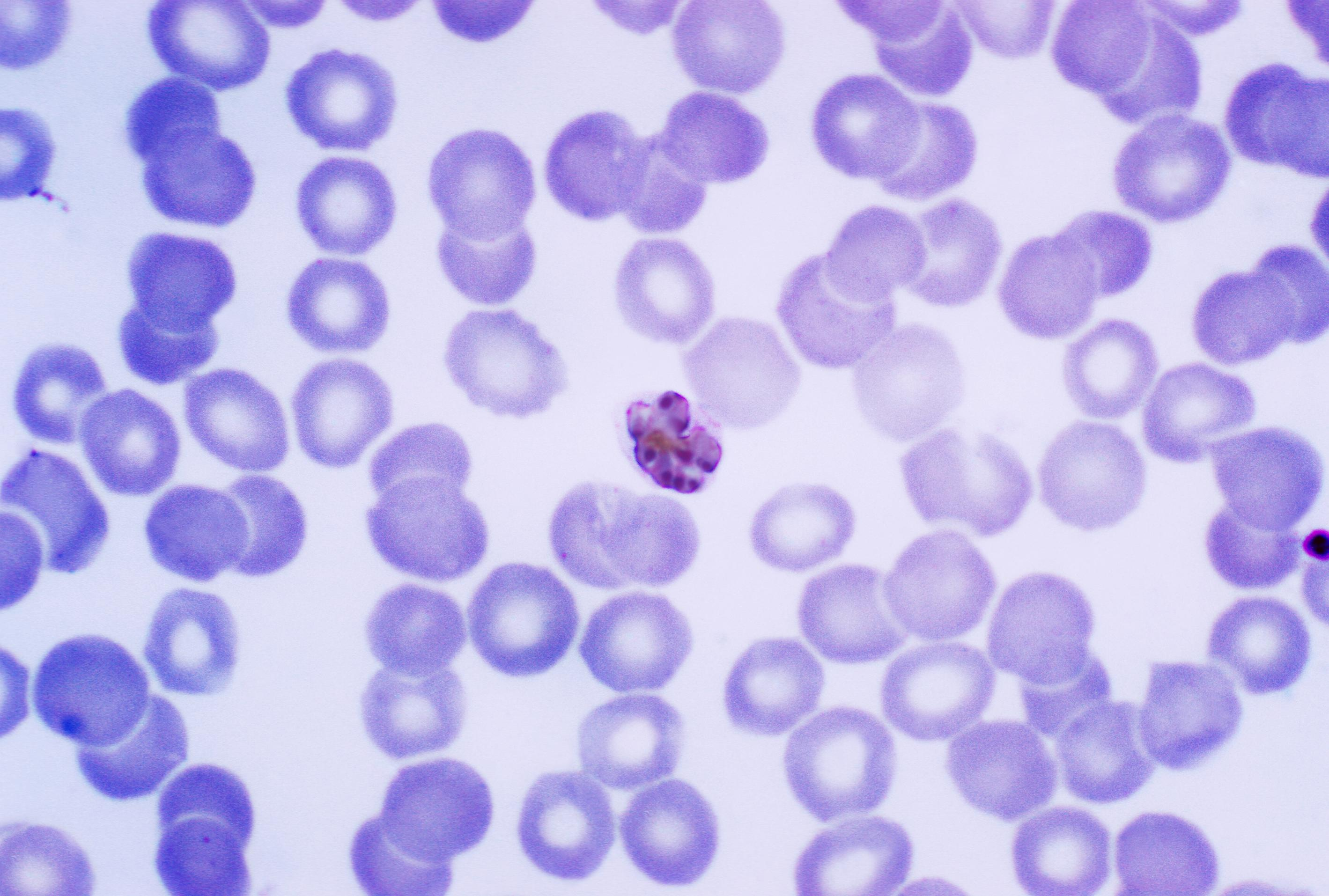
- Giemsa-stained micrograph of a mature Plasmodium malariae schizont

Scientific classification
- Domain: Eukaryota
- Clade: Sar
- Clade: Alveolata
- Phylum: Apicomplexa
- Class: Aconoidasida
- Order: Haemospororida
- Family: Plasmodiidae
- Genus: Plasmodium
- Species: P. malariae

Binomial name
- Plasmodium malariae (Feletti & Grassi, 1889)

Synonyms
- Haemamoeba malariae Feletti and Grassi, 1889; Plasmodium malariae var. quartanae Celli and Sanfelice, 1891; Plasmodium malariae quartanae Kruse, 1892; Haemamoeba laverani var. quartanae Labbe, 1894; Plasmodium rodhaini Brumpt, 1939

= Plasmodium malariae =

Species of single-celled organism

Plasmodium malariae is a parasitic protozoan that causes malaria in humans. It is one of several species of Plasmodium parasites that infect other organisms as pathogens, also including Plasmodium falciparum and Plasmodium vivax, responsible for most malarial infection. Found worldwide, it causes a so-called "benign malaria", not nearly as dangerous as that produced by P. falciparum or P. vivax. The signs include fevers that recur at approximately three-day intervals – a quartan fever or quartan malaria – longer than the two-day (tertian) intervals of the other malarial parasite.

== History ==
Malaria has been recognized since the Greek and Roman civilizations over 2,000 years ago, with different patterns of fever described by the early Greeks. In 1880, Alphonse Laveran discovered that the causative agent of malaria is a parasite. Detailed work of Golgi in 1886 demonstrated that in some patients there was a relationship between the 72-hour life cycle of the parasite and the chill and fever patterns in the patient. The same observation was found for parasites with 48-hour cycles. Golgi concluded that there must be more than one species of malaria parasite responsible for these different patterns of infection.

== Epidemiology ==
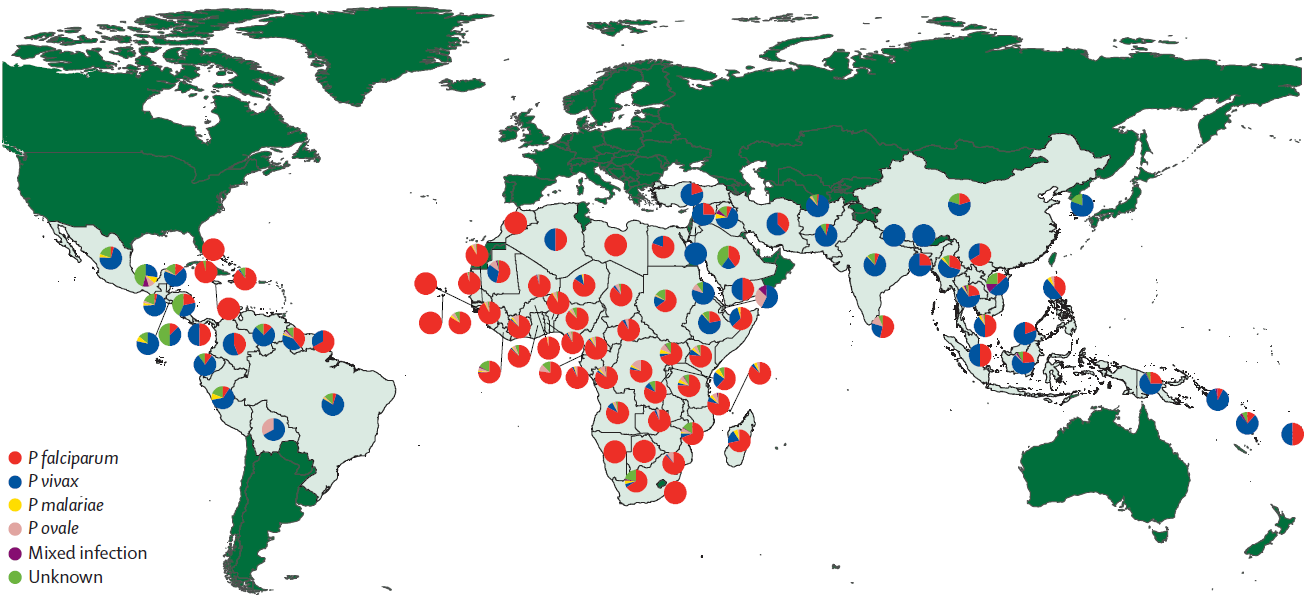
Relative incidence of Plasmodium species by country of origin for imported cases to non-endemic countries, showing P. malariae in yellow.

Each year, approximately 500 million people will be infected with malaria worldwide. Of those infected, roughly two million will die from the disease. Malaria is caused by six Plasmodium species: Plasmodium falciparum, Plasmodium vivax, Plasmodium ovale curtisi, Plasmodium ovale wallikeri, Plasmodium malariae and Plasmodium knowlesi. At any one time, an estimated 300 million people are said to be infected with at least one of these Plasmodium species and so there is a great need for the development of effective treatments for decreasing the yearly mortality and morbidity rates.

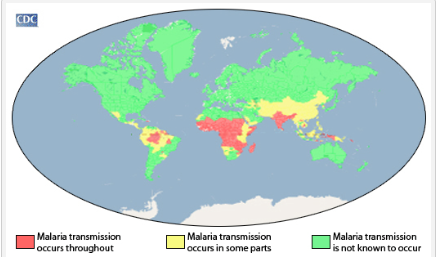
Geographical areas of malaria transmission

P. malariae is the least studied of the six species that infect humans, in part because of its low prevalence and milder clinical manifestations compared to the other species. It is widespread throughout sub-Saharan Africa, much of southeast Asia, Indonesia, on many of the islands of the western Pacific and in areas of the Amazon Basin of South America. In endemic regions, prevalence ranges from less than 4% to more than 20%, but there is evidence that P. malariae infections are vastly underreported.

The Centers for Disease Control (CDC) has an application that allows people to view specific parts of the world and how they are affected by Plasmodium vivax, and other types of the Plasmodium parasite. It can be found at the following link: http://cdc.gov/malaria/map/index.html.

== Role in disease ==
P. malariae can infect several species of mosquito and can cause malaria in humans. P. malariae can be maintained at very low infection rates among a sparse and mobile population because unlike the other Plasmodium parasites, it can remain in a human host for an extended period of time and still remain infectious to mosquitoes.

=== Vector ===
The vector of transmission of the parasite is the female Anopheles mosquito, but many different species have been shown to transmit the parasite at least experimentally. Collins and Jeffrey report over thirty different species, which vary by geographic region.

=== Incubation period ===
Information about the prepatent period, or the period of time between the infection of the parasite and demonstration of that parasite within the body, of P. malariae associated malaria is limited, but the data suggests that there is great variation, often the length of time depending on the strain of P. malariae parasite. Usually, the prepatent period ranges from 16 to 59 days.

=== Infection in humans ===
Plasmodium malariae causes a chronic infection that in some cases can last a lifetime. The P. malariae parasite has several differences between it and the other Plasmodium parasites, one being that maximum parasite counts are usually low compared to those in patients infected with P. falciparum or P. vivax. The reason for this can possibly be accounted for by the lower number of merozoites produced per erythrocytic cycle, the longer 72-hour developmental cycle (compared to the 48-hour cycle of P. vivax and P. falciparum), the preference for development in older erythrocytes and the resulting earlier development of immunity by the human host. Another defining feature of P. malariae is that the fever manifestations of the parasite are more moderate relative to those of P. falciparum and P. vivax and fevers show quartan periodicity. Along with bouts of fever and more general clinical symptoms such as chills and nausea, the presence of edema and the nephrotic syndrome has been documented with some P. malariae infections. It has been suggested that immune complexes may cause structural glomerular damage and that renal disease may also occur. Although P. malariae alone has a low morbidity rate, it does contribute to the total morbidity caused by all Plasmodium species, as manifested in the incidences of anemia, low birth rate and reduced resistance to other infections.

Due to a similarity in the appearances of the pathogens, P. knowlesi infections are often misdiagnosed as P. malariae infections. Molecular analysis is usually required for an accurate diagnosis.

=== Diagnostics ===
The preferable method for diagnosis of P. malariae is through the examination of peripheral blood films stained with Giemsa stain. PCR techniques are also commonly used for diagnoses confirmation as well as to separate mixed Plasmodium infections. Even with these techniques, however, it may still be impossible to differentiate infections, as is the case in areas of South America where humans and monkeys coexist and P. malariae and P. brasilianum are not easily distinguishable.

== Biology ==
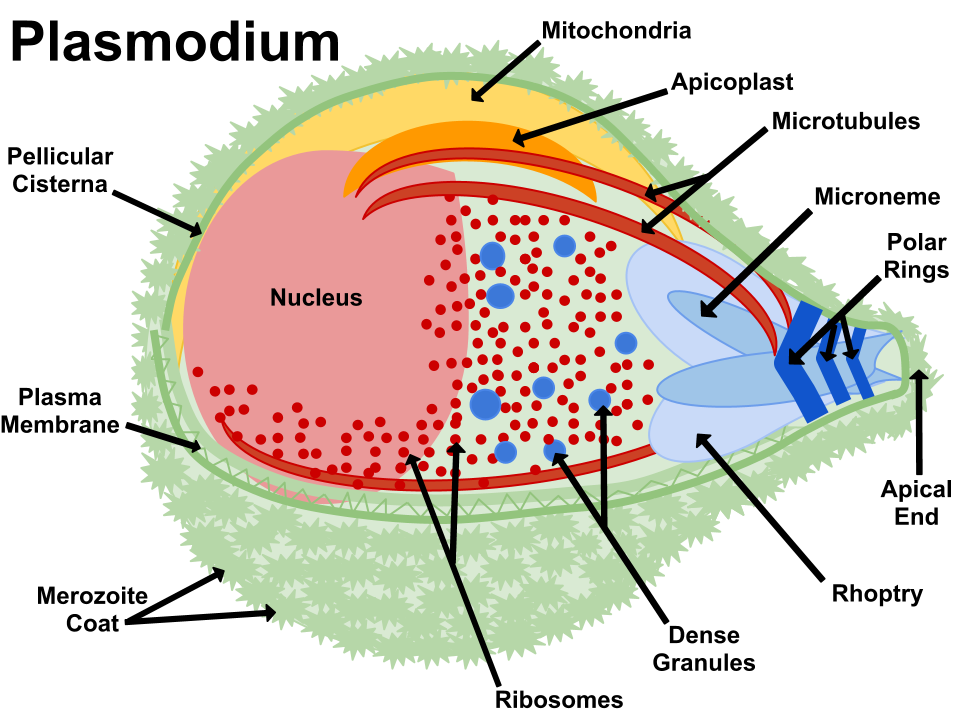
As a protist, Plasmodium is a eukaryote of the phylum Apicomplexa. Unusual characteristics of this organism in comparison to general eukaryotes include the rhoptry, micronemes, and polar rings near the apical end. Plasmodium is known best for the infection it causes in humans, namely, malaria.

=== Life cycle ===
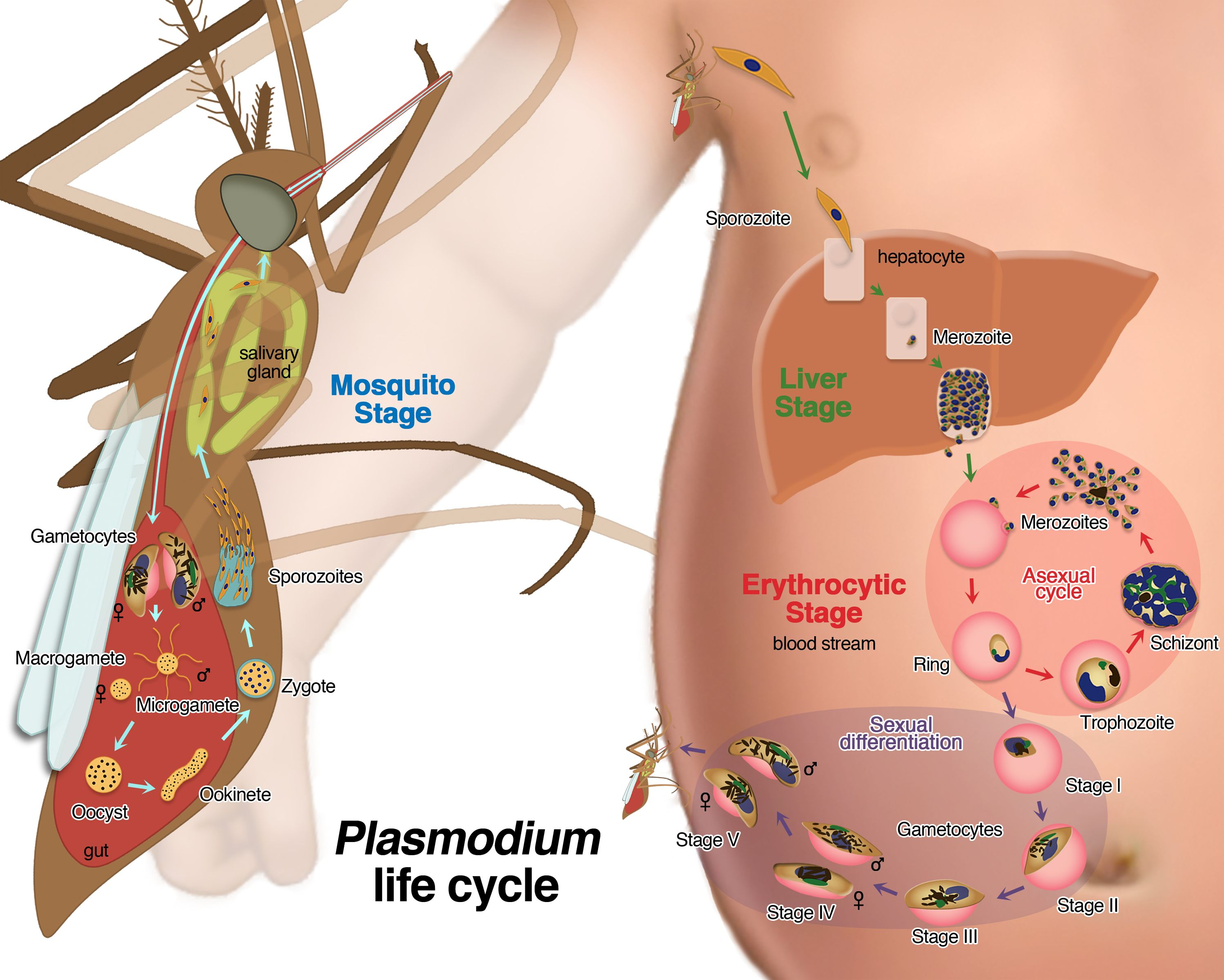
Plasmodium malariae wiki

P. malariae is the only human malaria parasite that causes fevers which recur at approximately three-day intervals (therefore occurring every fourth day, a quartan fever), longer than the two-day (tertian) intervals of the other malarial parasites.

=== Human infection ===
==== Liver stage and blood stage ====
In the liver stage, many thousands of merozoites are produced in each schizont. As the merozoites are released, they invade erythrocytes and initiate the erythrocytic cycle, where the parasite digests hemoglobin to obtain amino acids for protein synthesis.

The total length of the intraerythrocytic development is roughly 72 hours for P. malariae.

At the schizont stage, after schizogonic division, there are roughly 6–8 parasite cells in the erythrocyte.

Following the erythrocytic cycle, which lasts for seventy two hours on average, six to fourteen merozoites are released to reinvade other erythrocytes. Finally, some of the merozoites develop into either micro- or macrogametocytes. The two types of gametocytes are taken into the mosquito during feeding and the cycle is repeated. There are no animal reservoirs for P. malariae.

==== Mosquito stage ====
Similar to the other human-infecting Plasmodium parasites, Plasmodium malariae has distinct developmental cycles in the Anopheles mosquito and in the human host. The mosquito serves as the definitive host and the human host is the intermediate. When the Anopheles mosquito takes a blood meal from an infected individual, gametocytes are ingested from the infected person. A process known as exflagellation of the microgametocyte soon ensues and up to eight mobile microgametes are formed.

==== Sexual stage ====
Following fertilization of the macrogamete, a mobile ookinete is formed, which penetrates the peritropic membrane surrounding the blood meal and travels to the outer wall of the mid-gut of the mosquito. The oocyst then develops under the basal membrane and after a period of two to three weeks a variable amount of sporozoites are produced within each oocyst. The number of sporozoites that are produced varies with temperature and can range from anywhere between many hundreds to a few thousand. Eventually, the oocyst ruptures and the sporozoites are released into the hemocoel of the mosquito. The sporozoites are then carried by the circulation of the hemolymph to the salivary glands, where they become concentrated in the acinal cells. A small number of sporozoites are introduced into the salivary duct and injected into the skin of the bitten human. This subsequently leads to the cycle in the human liver.

=== Morphology ===
The ring stages that are formed by the invasion of merozoites released by rupturing liver stage schizonts are the first stages that appear in the blood. The ring stages grow slowly but soon fill one-fourth to one-third of the parasitized cell. Pigment increases rapidly and the half-grown parasite may have from 30 to 50 jet-black granules. The parasite changes various shapes as it grows and stretches across the host cell to form the band form.

== Laboratory considerations ==
P. vivax and P. ovale sitting in EDTA for more than 30 minutes before the blood film is made will look very similar in appearance to P. malariae, which is an important reason to warn the laboratory immediately when the blood sample is drawn so they can process the sample as soon as it arrives.

Microscopically, the parasitised red blood cell (erythrocyte) is never enlarged and may even appear smaller than that of normal red blood cells. The cytoplasm is not decolorized and no dots are visible on the cell surface. The food vacuole is small and the parasite is compact. Cells seldom host more than one parasite. Band forms, where the parasite forms a thick band across the width of the infected cell, are characteristic of this species (and some would say is diagnostic). Large grains of malarial pigment are often seen in these parasites: more so than any other Plasmodium species, 8 merozoites.

== Management and therapy ==
Failure to detect some P. malariae infections has led to modifications of the species-specific primers and to efforts towards the development of real-time PCR assays. The development of such an assay has included the use of generic primers that target a highly conserved region of the 18S rRNA genes of the four human-infecting species of Plasmodium. This assay was found to be highly specific and sensitive. Although serologic tests are not specific enough for diagnostic purposes, they can be used as basic epidemiologic tools. The immunofluorescent-antibody (IFA) technique can be used to measure the presence of antibodies to P. malariae.. A pattern has emerged in which an infection of short duration causes a rapidly declining immune response, but upon re-infection or recrudescence, the IFA level rises significantly and remains present for many months or years.

The increasing need to correctly identify P. malariae infection is underscored by its possible anti-malarial resistance. In a study by Müller-Stöver et al., the researchers presented three patients who were found to be infected with the parasite after taking anti-malarial medications. Given the slower pre-erythrocytic development and longer incubation period compared to the other malaria causing Plasmodium species, the researchers hypothesized that the anti-malarials may not be effective enough against the pre-erythrocytic stages of P. malariae. They thought that further development of P. malariae can occur when plasma concentrations of the anti-malarials gradually decrease after the anti-malarial medications are taken. According to Dr. William E. Collins from the Center of Disease Control (CDC), chloroquine is most commonly used for treatment and no evidence of resistance to this drug has been found. In that event, it is possible that the results from Müller-Stöver et al. provided isolated incidences.

== Public health, prevention strategies and vaccines ==
The food vacuole is the specialized compartment that degrades hemoglobin during the asexual erythrocytic stage of the parasite. It is implied that effective drug treatments can be developed by targeting the proteolytic enzymes of the food vacuole. In a paper published in 1997, Westling et al. focused their attention on the aspartic endopeptidase class of enzymes, simply called plasmepsins. They sought to characterize the specificity for the enzymes cloned from P. vivax and P. malariae. Using substrate specificity studies and inhibitor analysis, it was found that the plasmepsins for P. malariae and P. vivax showed less specificity than that for P. falciparum. Unfortunately, this means that the development of a selective inhibitor for P. malariae may prove more challenging than the development of one for P. falciparum. Another study by Bruce et al. presented evidence that there may be regular genetic exchange within P. malariae populations. Six polymorphic genetic markers from P. malariae were isolated and analyzed in 70 samples of naturally acquired P. malariae infections from different parts of the world. The data showed a high level of multi-genotypic carriage in humans.

Both of these experiments illustrate that development of vaccine options will prove challenging, if not impossible. Dr. William Collins doubts that anyone is currently looking for possible vaccines for P. malariae and given the complexity of the parasite it can be inferred why. He states that very few studies are conducted with this parasite, perhaps as a result of its perceived low morbidity and prevalence. Collins cites the great restrictions of studies with chimpanzees and monkeys as a sizeable barrier. Since the Plasmodium brasilianium parasite that infects South American monkeys is thought to be an adapted form of P. malariae, more research with P. brasilianium may hold valuable insight into P. malariae.

A recent study shows that quartan malaria parasites are easily exchanged between humans and monkeys in Latin America. Thus, a lack of host specificity in mammalian hosts can be hypothesized and quartan malaria can be considered to be a true anthropozoonosis.

The continuing work with the plasmepsin associated with P. malariae, plasmepsin 4, by Professor Ben Dunn and his research team from the University of Florida may provide hope for long term malaria control in the near future.

== Genome ==
In 2017 the full genome was published. The sequences can be accessed on geneDB.org and plasmoDB.org.

== See also ==
- List of parasites (human)
- Malaria
- Plasmodium falciparum
- Plasmodium vivax
- Plasmodium ovale
