= Pamaquine =

Drug (of the 8-aminoquinoline class) formerly used to treat malaria

Clinical data
- ATC code: none

Identifiers
- IUPAC name: N,N-diethyl-N'-(6-methoxyquinolin-8-yl)pentane- 1,4-diamine
- CAS Number: 491-92-9
- PubChem CID: 10290
- ChemSpider: 9868
- UNII: 99QVL5KPSU
- ChEMBL: ChEMBL472698
- CompTox Dashboard (EPA): DTXSID90862331

Chemical and physical data
- Formula: C_{19}H_{29}N_{3}O
- Molar mass: 315.461 g·mol^{−1}
- 3D model (JSmol): Interactive image
- SMILES: O(c1cc(NC(C)CCCN(CC)CC)c2ncccc2c1)C
- InChI: InChI=1S/C19H29N3O/c1-5-22(6-2)12-8-9-15(3)21-18-14-17(23-4)13-16-10-7-11-20-19(16)18/h7,10-11,13-15,21H,5-6,8-9,12H2,1-4H3; Key:QTQWMSOQOSJFBV-UHFFFAOYSA-N

Pamaquine is an 8-aminoquinoline drug formerly used for the treatment of malaria. It is closely related to primaquine.

== Synonyms ==
- Plasmochin
- Plasmoquine
- Plasmaquine

== Uses ==
Pamaquine is effective against the hypnozoites of the relapsing malarias (P. vivax and P. ovale); and unlike primaquine, it is also very effective against the erythrocytic stages of all four human malarias. One small clinical trial of pamaquine as a causal prophylactic was disappointing (whereas primaquine is an extremely effective causal prophylactic).

Pamaquine is more toxic and less efficacious than primaquine; therefore, pamaquine is no longer routinely used, and of the two, only primaquine is currently recommended by the World Health Organization.

== Adverse effects ==
Like primaquine, pamaquine causes haemolytic anaemia in patients with G6PD deficiency. Patients should therefore always be screened for G6PD deficiency prior to being prescribed pamaquine.

== History ==
Pamaquine was the second synthetic antimalarial drug to be discovered (after methylene blue). It was synthesised by Schulemann, Schoenhoeffer and Wingler in 1924. In 1926, Roehl demonstrated that pamaquine was effective in treating malaria in birds, and introduced it into use in humans. Its development is of interest in the history of pharmacotherapy because it was one of the early victories in validating the potential of applying organic chemistry to the synthesis of chemicals that would fight infections with good specificity while presenting adverse effect profiles small enough that benefit would outweigh harm, relative to the contemporary alternative of little to no efficacious treatment for many debilitating diseases. In other words, it expanded the evidence that the hope for great potential of antimicrobial chemotherapy shown by Paul Ehrlich and others was worth pursuing with more research—and that early wins such as arsphenamine were more than just isolated flukes. This was a time period when organic chemistry's largest economic applications included textile dyes, explosives, munitions, and chemical weapons but not yet pharmaceuticals. The fact that systematic, iterative experiments had eventually synthesized an antimalarial drug that was 30 times more effective than quinine while being safe enough to use (relative to the bleak alternatives of the era) supported the concept of modern pharmaceutical research laboratories as it would develop in coming decades.

A large trial of pamaquine performed by the Royal Army Medical Corps and the British Indian Medical Service in 1929 showed for the first time that it was possible to prevent relapse of vivax malaria. Prior to this, it was understood that patients with vivax malaria would suffer from relapses, but there was no treatment that could prevent the relapses from occurring.

The relative weights of treatment benefit and harm change over decades as science advances. About a decade after pamaquine became available, chloroquine arrived, and about a decade after that, primaquine arrived. Pamaquine is more toxic and less efficacious than primaquine; therefore, pamaquine is no longer routinely used, and of the two, only primaquine is currently recommended by the World Health Organization.
