= 8-Aminoquinoline =

Antimalarial drug precursor

Names
- Preferred IUPAC name Quinolin-8-amine

Identifiers
CAS Number	578-66-5
3D model (JSmol)	Interactive image
ChEMBL	ChEMBL99932
ChemSpider	10881
ECHA InfoCard	100.008.572
PubChem CID	11359
UNII	U34EAV21TG
CompTox Dashboard (EPA)	DTXSID4060369
- InChI: InChI=1S/C9H8N2/c10-8-5-1-3-7-4-2-6-11-9(7)8/h1-6H,10H2 Key: WREVVZMUNPAPOV-UHFFFAOYSA-N
- SMILES: Nc1cccc2cccnc12

Properties
Chemical formula	C_{9}H_{8}N_{2}
Molar mass	144.177 g·mol^{−1}
Appearance	pale yellow solid
Density	1.337 g/cm^{3}
Melting point	65 °C (149 °F; 338 K)
- Except where otherwise noted, data are given for materials in their standard state (at 25 °C [77 °F], 100 kPa). verify (what is ?) Infobox references

8-Aminoquinoline is the 8-amino derivative of quinoline. Often abbreviated AQ, it is a pale yellow solid. It is structurally analogous to 8-hydroxyquinoline.

== Drug derivatives ==
The derivatives primaquine, tafenoquine and pamaquine have been tested for anti-malaria activity. Primaquine is still used routinely worldwide as part of the treatment of Plasmodium vivax and Plasmodium ovale malaria, although how it prevents malarial recurrences is not, at present, clear. Tafenoquine was approved for medical use in Australia and in the United States in 2018.

Primaquine

Pamaquine

Tafenoquine

== Directing group ==
The amine functional group is amenable to formation of amides, and thus can serve as a directing group in organic synthesis.

== Preparation ==
The original synthesis of AQ involved nitration of quinoline to give a mixture of the 5- and 8-nitroderivatives, which were separated by distillation and sublimation. Reduction of the 8-nitro isomer with tin powder in the presence of hydrochloric acid gave the amines. AQ can also be produced by amination of 8-chloroquinoline.
