= ATSB =

ATSB may refer to:

- Australian Transport Safety Bureau, a federal government body in Australia, investigates air, sea accidents etc.
- Arbeiter-Turn- und Sportbund, a former worker's sports federation in Germany
- Astronautic Technology Sdn Bhd, a Malaysian research organization
- Air Transportation Stabilization Board, a United States government department, concerned with financial stability within the air industry
- Attractive toxic sugar baits, an insecticide for mosquitos
