= Wilhelm Schüffner =

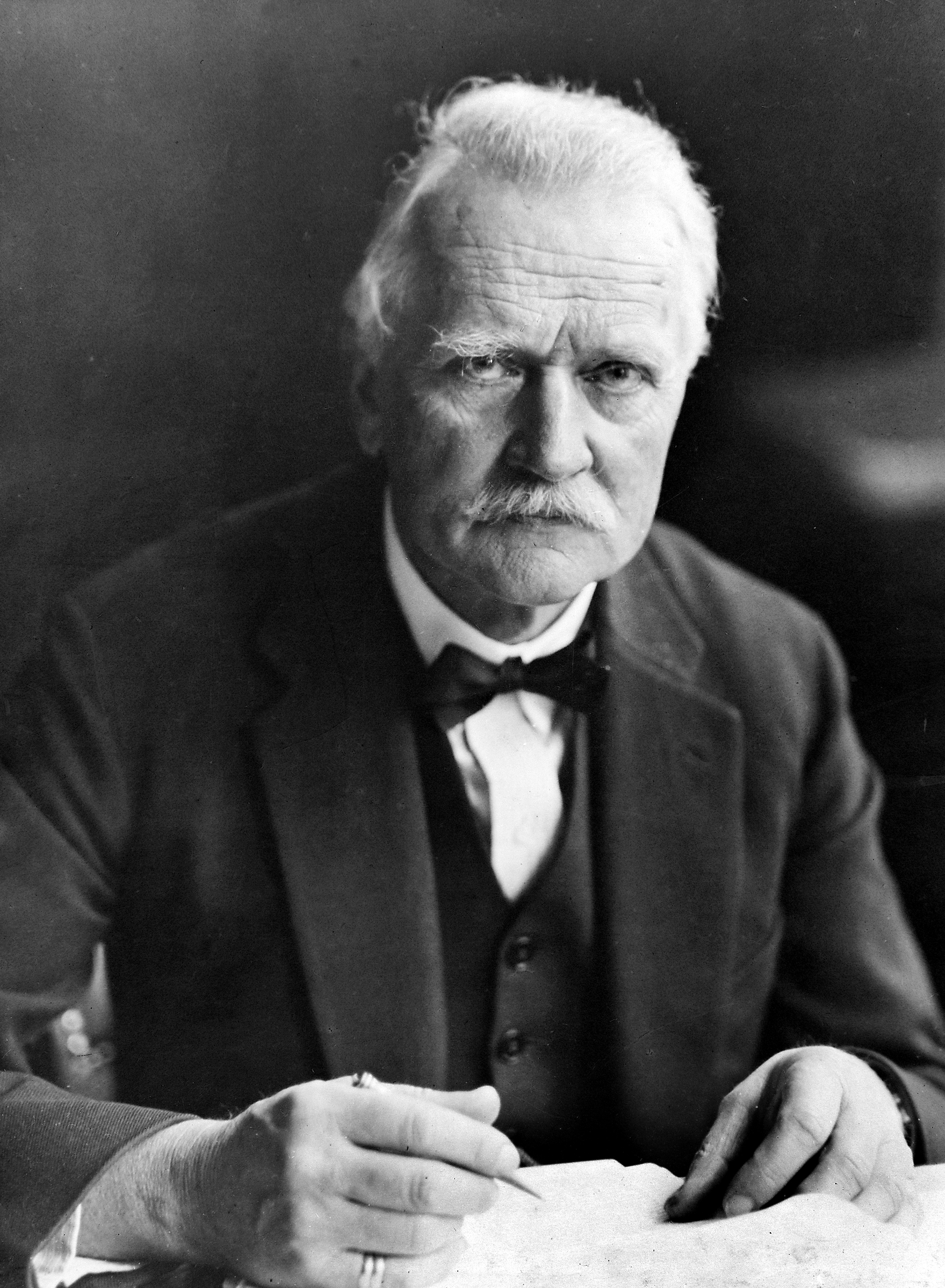

Wilhelm August Paul Schüffner (2 January 1867, Ovenstädt – 24 December 1949, Hilversum) was a German pathologist and epidemiologist who worked mainly in the Dutch East India colonies and specialized in the study of malaria.

Schüffner received an MD from Leipzig and was made honorary MD by Amsterdam University in 1912. He identified the rodent reservoir of Leptospirosis. He was a medical officer from 1897 in the Semembah Tobacco estate in eastern Sumatra and until 1923 he worked in the Dutch colonies in Java and Indonesia studying malaria. He worked on the healthcare of plantation workers in Senembah Maatschappij, Deli, North Sumatra. He demonstrated malaria control through management of hygiene. He recorded the characteristic red stippling found in red blood cells of patients infected by tertian malaria (Plasmodium vivax) which are now known as Schüffner's dots.

From 1916 he was a public health advisor to the colonial government of the Dutch East India Company. He was elected fellow of the Royal Dutch Academy of Sciences in 1926 and Leopoldina in 1935.
