= Quartan fever =

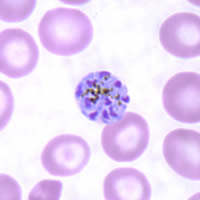
- P. malariae schizont in a thick blood smear
- Specialty: Infectious disease
- Symptoms: Fever
- Duration: Fever in 72 hour intervals
- Causes: Plasmodium spread by mosquitos
- Diagnostic method: Blood tests
- Medication: Chloroquine

Quartan fever is one of the four types of malaria which can be contracted by humans.

It is specifically caused by the Plasmodium malariae species, one of the six species of the protozoan genus Plasmodium. Quartan fever is a form of malaria where an onset of fever occurs in an interval of three to four days, hence the name "quartan". It is transmitted by bites of infected female mosquitoes of the genus Anopheles. Symptoms include fevers which range from approximately 40–41 °C (104–106 °F) and occur periodically in 72 hour intervals. Although cases of malaria have occurred throughout the world, quartan fever typically occurs in the subtropics. Quartan fever is considered to be a less severe form of malaria fever that can be cured by anti-malarial medication, and prevention methods can be taken in order to avoid infection.

== Signs and symptoms ==
Early indications of quartan fever include having irritated spots, welts, hives and burning skin, however this is dependent on individual's tolerance to mosquito bites and may not be evident on some people. With the Anopheles malaria mosquitoes, the welts are most likely to not appear unless there are severe allergic reactions.

== Cause ==
The female Anopheles mosquito is a vector which transmits quartan fever to people. Mature mosquitoes carry uninucleate sporozoites in their salivary glands; these sporozoites enter a human's bloodstream when mosquitoes puncture human flesh during feeding. Sporozoites attack and inhabit liver parenchymal cells, called hepatocytes, in order to develop further. Once the uninucleate sporozoites have matured, the sporozoites then develop into uninucleate merozoites. Uninucleated merozoites mature into an erythrocytic stage called schizonts which contain merozoites. The schizonts, an infected erythrocyte, then rupture to release these merozoites; leading to more infections in the red blood cells. Uninucleated merozoites can also mature into uninucleate gametocytes which can invade and infect other female Anopheles mosquitoes during feeding, thus spreading the disease onto a wider population of humans.

Anopheles Mosquito feeding (video taken County Durham, UK.)

== Diagnosis ==
Fevers in intervals of 72 hours distinguish quartan fever from other forms of malaria where fevers range in 48 hour intervals or fever spikes that occur sporadically.

The prepatent period is the time interval for when parasites infect a host and when they can be detected on a thick blood film. For quartan fever, P. malariae has a prepatent period ranging from 16 to 59 days. Specifically in the case of quartan fever, the rupturing of liver stage schizonts releases merozoites. This stage of the P. malariae life cycle is known as the "ring stages" and are the first stages which can be detected in human blood for diagnosis.

=== Medical procedures that diagnose quartan fever ===
- Blood smears can be used to detect the parasites within red blood cells, thick blood smears are typically used initially to detect the parasites, then it is followed by thin blood smears which can detect the parasites as the morphology of erythrocytes is maintained through the process.
- Peripheral blood films stained with Giemsa stain are a method of blood examination used to diagnose the presence of Plasmodium malariae, and detect quartan fever.
- Rapid diagnostic tests can detect the antigens which cause malaria. A sample of blood is collected from the patient and placed on a test card. After 15–20 minutes bands show up on the test card, which indicate the specific species of malaria the patient is infected with.
- Serological tests are used in general to detect whether a patient has developed antibodies to specific microorganism, therefore serological tests are used to detect past encounters with Plasmodium virus rather than acute cases where a patient has just been infected with P. malariae and has quartan fever.
- Polymerase chain reactions (PCR) are used to diagnose Plasmodium malariae, the cause of quartan fever, as well as to distinguish mixed infections with different species of Plasmodium.

== Prevention ==
Ways to minimise exposure to the Anopheles mosquito include:

- Indoor residual sprays are one of the most utilised methods of malaria prevention by the Global Malaria Eradication Campaign. Spraying is a method used to control malaria epidemics.
- Nets treated with insecticide are effective at preventing mosquito contact for three years. The World Health Organization (WHO) specifically protects younger children and pregnant women to reduce the risk of spreading quartan fever within the population.
- Sulfadoxine/pyrimethamine (SP) administration to pregnant individuals is also a source of prevention to reduce the risks of anemia in pregnancy, low birth weight, and perinatal mortality. SP reduces the impact of quartan fever on newborns and decreases the mortality rate. This method of prevention is known as chemoprophylaxis.

Anopheles mosquito larvae, taken by Steffen Dietzel

- House improvement is also a method of prevention. Traditional houses constructed from natural materials are susceptible to gaps that allow entry to Anopheles. House improvements, including sealed windows and doors, reduce the risk of coming in contact with the infected mosquitoes.
- Larval source management is the control and monitoring of aquatic environments to prevent Anopheles mosquitoes from fully developing. Mosquitoes require aquatic environments to mature and develop fully. Once the mosquito eggs hatch, the larvae must live in the water and develop into pupae. The pupa stage then matures into a fully developed mosquito and emerges from its aquatic habitat. When removing any water-filled containers from the surrounding area, the mosquito life cycle is halted and acts as a method to reduce the mosquito population within the surrounding area.

Clothing can act as a physical barrier to prevent mosquitoes from feeding on exposed flesh, and treating beds and clothing with insecticides or repellents can further reduce the chances of infected mosquitoes biting and transmitting quartan fever to individuals.

- Avoiding areas with high mosquito populations, specifically those with the quartan fever-causing P. malariae strain.
- Avoid travelling to regions with a subtropical climate to prevent infection and the development of quartan fever.
- Implementing the sugar baiting method aids in reducing the population of Anopheles mosquitoes, and ultimately reducing the likelihood of catching quartan fever. Both male and female mosquitoes feed on the attractive toxic sugar baits (ATSB) and ingest low-risk oral toxins, e.g. boric acid. This leads to the death of mosquitoes and reduces their population.
