= Giovanni Battista Grassi =

Italian physician and zoologist (1854–1925)

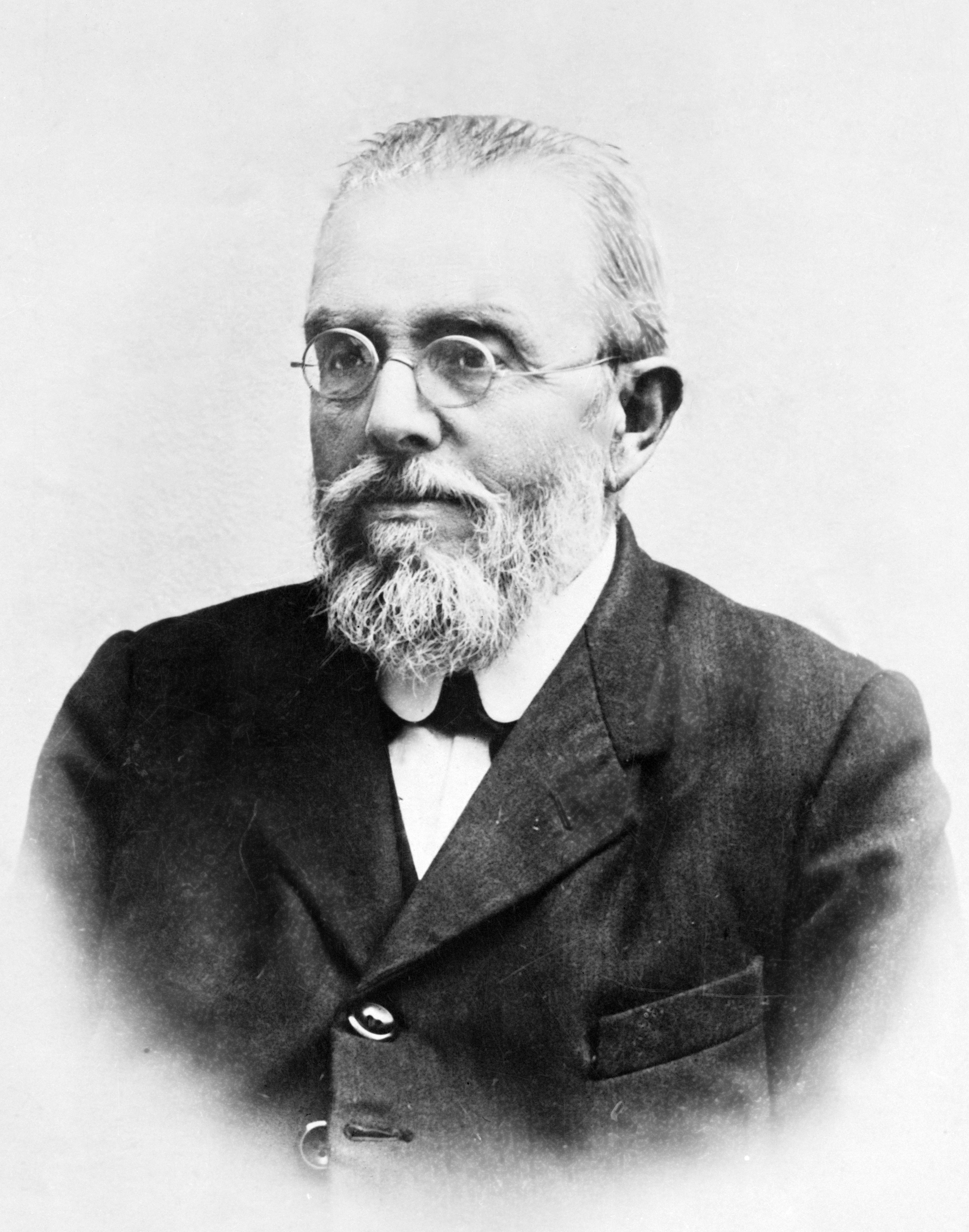
- Born: 27 March 1854; Rovellasca, Austrian Empire
- Died: 4 May 1925 (aged 71); Rome, Italy
- Resting place: Fiumicino; 41°46′N 12°14′E
- Education: University of Pavia
- Known for: Plasmodium life cycle Malaria control
- Awards: Darwin Medal
- Scientific career
- Fields: Medicine, Entomology, Parasitology
- Workplaces: University of Catania; Sapienza University of Rome
- Doctoral students: Gustavo Pittaluga Fattorini

Giovanni Battista Grassi (27 March 1854 – 4 May 1925) was an Italian physician and zoologist, best known for his pioneering works on parasitology, especially on malariology. He was Professor of Comparative Zoology at the University of Catania from 1883, and Professor of Comparative Anatomy at Sapienza University of Rome from 1895 until his death. His first major research on the taxonomy and biology of termites earned him the Royal Society's Darwin Medal in 1896.

Grassi's scientific contributions covered embryological development of honey bees, on helminth parasites, the vine parasite phylloxera, on migrations and metamorphosis in eels, on arrow worms and termites. He was the first to demonstrate the life cycle of human dwarf tapeworm Taenia nana, and that this tapeworm does not require an intermediate host, contrary to popular belief. He was the first to demonstrate the direct life cycle of the roundworm Ascaris lumbricoides by self-experimentation. He described canine filarial worm Dipetalonema reconditum, and demonstrated the parasite life cycle in fleas, Pulex irritans. He invented the genus of threadworms Strongyloides. He named the spider Koenenia mirabilis in 1885 after his wife, Maria Koenen. He pioneered the foundation of pest control for phylloxera of grapes.

The most important contributions of Grassi are on malariology, discovering different species of malarial parasites in birds and humans, and their transmission. With Raimondo Feletti, he discovered Haemamoeba praecox and H. relictum (now under the genus Plasmodium) in birds. They correctly described Haemamoeba malariae and H. vivax (both now under Plasmodium), which became fundamental to clinical distinction of different human malaria: benign tertian caused by P. vivax, malignant tertian by P. falciparum and benign quartan by P. malariae). He was the first to describe and establish the life cycle of the human malarial parasite, Plasmodium falciparum, the most prevalent and deadliest species. He discovered that only female anopheline mosquitoes are capable of transmitting the disease.

Grassi's works in malaria remain a lasting controversy in the history of Nobel Prizes. Since the inception of Nobel Prizes in 1901 until his death, he was nominated 21 times. For the 1902 Nobel Prize in Physiology or Medicine, he was nominated alongside French physician Charles Louis Alphonse Laveran, who discovered P. falciparum, and British army surgeon Ronald Ross. He and Ross were shortlisted for the final award, but Ross who appeared to have make the least important discovery, the transmission of malarial parasite in birds, was the sole winner. Grassi, who demonstrated the complete route of transmission of human Plasmodium, and correctly identified the types of malarial parasite as well as the mosquito vector, Anopheles claviger, was denied.

== Biography ==
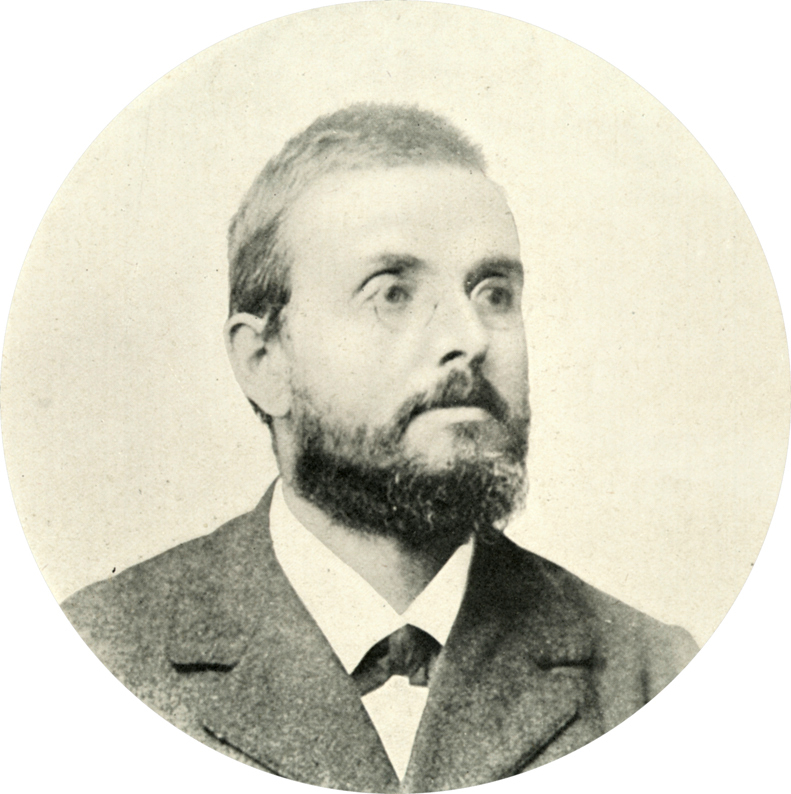
Giovanni Battista Grassi

Grassi was born in Rovellasca, Italy, in what is now the Province of Como. His father Luigi Grassi was a municipal official, and mother Costanza Mazzuchelli was a noted peasant of unusual intelligence. He completed elementary education at Bolchi-Stucchi private school in Saronno, and secondary education at Volta high school in Como.

From 1872 he studied medicine at the University of Pavia under professors Camillo Golgi and Giulio Bizzozero and graduated in 1878. After graduation he worked first at Messina in the Naples Zoological Station and the Oceanographic Station founded by Nicolaus Kleinenberg and Anton Dohrn where he studied Chaetognatha, then completed his training at the University of Heidelberg in Germany under the guidance of Carl Gegenbaur and Otto Bütschli. While in Heidelberg, he met a fellow student Maria Koenen whom she married in 1879.

In 1883, he became Professor of Comparative Zoology at the University of Catania, studying cestodes, the life cycle of the European eel (Catania) and the Moray eel (Rome). Also in Catania he began to study entomology and wrote a student text "The Origin and Descent of Myriapods and Insects" in addition to scientific papers. He also began to study malaria working with Raimondo Feletti on malaria, discovering the parasite species of human and bird malaria.

In 1895, he was appointed Chair of Comparative Anatomy at Sapienza University of Rome, where he would spend the rest of his life. He joined Angelo Celli, Amico Bignami, Giuseppe Bastianelli and Ettore Marchiafava, who were working on malaria in districts around Rome. Grassi was the group's entomologist. The group announced at the session of the Accademia dei Lincei on 4 December 1889 that a healthy man in a non-malarial zone had contracted tertian malaria after being bitten by an experimentally infected Anopheles claviger.

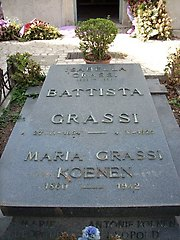
Grassi's tomb

In 1902, Grassi abandoned his study of malaria and began work on the sandfly responsible for Leishmaniasis (Phlebotomus papatasii) and on a serious insect pest of the grape vine (Phylloxera vastatrix). In 1903, Rome university created a department of agricultural entomology in which Grassi became the first teacher. Endemic malaria returned to Italy during and after the First World War and Grassi resumed his mosquito studies.

Grassi spent much of his later years in Fiumicino, a commune in the province of Rome, where his family had settled. There, he built a private clinic for children with malaria, and which he bestowed to her daughter Isabella for continued service after his death. He died in Rome in 1925 while reading the proof of his last paper, Lezione sulla malaria.

Following his will, he was interred at a village cemetery in Fiumicino, as he achieved his most important medical services there. His wife Maria (1860–1942) and daughter were also interred at the same tomb.

== Scientific contributions ==
=== General zoology and entomology ===
Grassi's earlier works were on anatomy and then entomology. He studied the development of the vertebral column in bony fishes and also endemic goiter. His studies on bees, myriapods and termites were monumental. His reports on termites and their biology earned him an international recognition as a zoologist. He described 21 species of termites and documented the first observations of the protozoan parasites inside them. He also studied the arrow worms and the reproduction of eels. He published his first report on the arrow worms in 1881 and a monograph in 1883 by which he described 14 new species and established that the animals are not related to molluscs and coelenterates, as then believed to be. Earlier 1881, he had discovered that arrow worms harbour amoeboid parasites, and described one new species, Janickina pigmentifera. The arrow worms were later classified as a separate phylum Chaetognatha, and are recognised as "enigmatic" animals. His associate Salvatore Calandruccio collected an unusual spider from Mount Etna in Sicily. Grassi identified it as not only new species but as belonging to a new family, and gave the name, Koenenia mirabilis in 1885, dedicated to his wife.

He also made significant contribution to the study of the phylloxera of grapes, which he pursued for several years. The notes of his observations La questione fillosserica in Italia (1904) influenced the Italian Ministry of Agriculture, which eventually requested him to do an exhaustive study of this subject. In 1912 he produced a monumental investigation of the morphology and biology of the Italian and other European genera of phylloxera. It was a foundation for systematic control of agricultural pests.

=== Helminthology ===
In 1876, Grassi investigated his native hometown Rovellasca for the high mortality of cats and discovered that they were heavily infected with the nematode (roundworm) Dochmius balsami. In 1878, while still a student at the University of Pavia, he made the first description of Ancylostoma caninum, a roundworm that causes ancylostomiasis in cats, after identifying the eggs from the faeces of infected individuals. His method of egg identification was immediately useful for the detection of A. duodenale infection in humans. He continued to make great impacts on the study of Anguillula intestinalis, filarial worms, Trichocephalus dispar, and Bilharzia. He was the first to show that the human dwarf tapeworm Taenia nana (Hymenolepis nana) is able to go through its entire life cycle in one animal, without the need of an intermediate host, a notion that had long been rejected. At the time, it was known that a closely related species H. dimunita required rats as definitive hosts and arthropods as intermediate hosts, which was the basis of presumption that all dwarf tapeworms must use two different hosts. He was also the first to show that the flea Pulex serraticeps is the intermediate host of feline tapeworm Taenia elliptica. Thus he proposed that swallowing of infected fleas (for example, with milk) might be the reason for taeniasis in children. In 1879 he published a work on the life cycle of Strongyloides stercoralis, and erected the genus Strongyloides. In 1890 he, with Salvatore Calandruccio, described Dipetalonema reconditum, a non-pathogenic filarial worm of dogs, and showed that the parasite completed its development in human fleas, Pulex irritans.

The first crucial step in understanding the life cycle of the roundworm Ascaris lumbricoides was demonstrated by Grassi in a grotesque self-experimentation. To solve a century-old puzzle of how infection of roundworm is transmitted from one host to another, he ingested the roundworm eggs on 30 August 1879. He had obtained the eggs from a human corpse, which was heavily infected, upon autopsy on 10 October 1878. After twenty-two days, he found fresh eggs in his faeces. Thus proving that the roundworm is transmitted through direct ingestion from contaminated source.

In 1879, Grassi became the first to identify protozoans similar to amoebas from the human excreta. He gave a vivid description of the then named Amoeba coli, later classified as Entamoeba coli, which he considered to be harmless parasites as he found them from both sick and heathy individuals. At the time, these protozoans were believed to be pathogenic parasites like other amoebas. The amoebas are later established as commensal parasites that contribute to the healthy environment (human microbiome) of the gastrointestinal tract, and closely related to the pathogenic species, E. histolytica. His report in 1885 showed the role of commensal protozoans in the digestion process of food in termites. In 1887, he described a roundworm Filaria inermis that caused filariasis in horses, and later found to infect humans as well.

=== Malariology ===
==== Discovery of malarial parasites ====
Grassi started to study malaria in 1888 while at the University of Catania, with a colleague Raimondo Feletti. The first malarial parasite of humans was discovered by French Army physician Charles Louis Alphonse Laveran, while working at Bône Hospital (now Annaba in Algeria), in 1880. Laveran gave the name Oscillaria malariae, which was ultimately changed to Plasmodium falciparum by the International Commission on Zoological Nomenclature (ICZN) in 1954. Grassi and Feletti made the second discovery the next year that the harmless form of malaria was caused by a very similar protozoan which they named Laverania malariae (the genus name honouring Laveran). They reported the discovery in the December issue of Riforma Medica as "Sui Parasiti della Malaria" (On the Parasite of Malaria). The sequel report in 1890 described the discovery of the third human malarial parasite which they called Haemamoeba vivax. Along with the new description indicating obvious relationship between the two parasite, they reclassified Laverania malariae into Haemamoeba and renamed it H. malariae. As approved by ICZN, the two parasites are known as Plasmodium malariae and P. vivax.

Grassi and Feletii also discovered described malaria parasite of birds, including Haemamoeba praecox (in 1890) and H. relictum (in 1891). The species were later moved to the genus Plasmodium, with the original name used to designate the subgenus. In 1891, Grassi performed the first inoculation of malaria parasites from one bird into another. Grassi reused the genus Laverania for O. malariae (unbeknown to Laveran, Oscillaria was already a scientific name for other protists). It was from his systematic analysis that the standard classification of malaria and their parasites became fundamental to medical practices: benign tertian is caused by H. vivax (P. vivax), malignant tertian by L. malariae (P. falciparum) and benign quartan by H. malariae (P. malariae).

==== Life cycle of Plasmodium falciparum ====
Moving to the Sapienza University of Rome in 1895, Grassi joined established malariologists Bignami and Bastianelli to further investigate on malaria, most importantly, on how it was transmitted. By then, Bignami and Bastianelli were already investigating the hypothesis that certain blood-feeding insects must be responsible for transmitting malaria. Grassi was able to obtain malaria samples easily from the Hospital of the Holy Spirit (Ospedale di Santo Spirito in Sassia). In 1898, he took a field trip to his hometown collecting mosquitos for experiments. An impetus came from the report from India. In June, The British Medical Journal announced that Ronald Ross, surgeon of the Indian Medical Service in Calcutta (now Kolkata), had successfully demonstrated mosquito transmitting malarial parasites. (The full report was published in September 1898.) In Ross's case the experiment was an infection of bird malaria in sparrows from the bite of what he called "grey" mosquitos. Upon the news, Grassi knew that it was important to test the possibility of human infection from mosquitos. In September, on his way back to Rome, he collected mosquitos some of which he could identify as Anopheles.

With Bignami and Bastianelli, Grassi experimented with different mosquitos to see if they could take up live parasites after feeding on the blood of malarial individuals. After several failed attempts, Grassi found that only Anopheles was capable of taking up the parasites and maintain them alive inside its gut. On 20 October, he let the mosquito (that he identified as Anopheles maculipennis, synonym of A. claviger) bite a malarial individual (here a P. falciparum infection). With careful experimentation, he used himself as a test subject (control) by covering himself with an iron net inside the same room where the mosquitos were released. When the blood-fed mosquitos were dissected after few days, several developmental stages of the parasite were visible inside the mosquito. The most important observation was oocysts (from which human infective forms, sporozoa, would eventually emerge) that indicated the successful growth of the parasite in the mosquitos. Grassi, Bignami and Bastianelli reported the discovery to the Accademia dei Lincei on 6 November 1898, and was formally read before the meeting of the academy on 4 December. The discovery had several specific observations:

- Grassi alone found out that only female mosquitos (specifically in case of A. claviger) bit humans or animals, thus, responsible for transmitting the malarial parasite.
- All stages of the parasite development could be seen in different mosquitos and the ideal temperature of growth is 30 °C.
- The parasite development starts in the midgut (they called middle intestine), turning into crescents (now called ookinete) that penetrate the gut epithelium, transform into smaller bodies (they noted as identical to crescent but pigmented, now called oocysts), grow in size and multiply, elongate to filamentous bodies which they correctly named sporozoites.
- The sporozoites freely move in the body cavity (coelom) of the mosquito. The mature sporozoites are accumulated in the tubes of the salivary glands, becoming motionless.
- The sporozoites are released by the mosquitos when they bite, but not all. Thus, sporozoites are the only human infective stage. Those that are not released from the salivary glands eventually degenerate and are digested by the mosquito.

Bignami and Bastianelli published the experiments in the December issue of the Lancet, Bastianelli especially trying to take majority of the credits in a single-authored report, and explicitly omitting the contributions of Grassi. Grassi published a justification that the main critical experiment was designed and performed by only himself.

In early 1899, Grassi and his colleagues demonstrated similar growth pattern for P. vivax and P. malariae and that different species were transmitted by only specific mosquito species. Grassi's comprehensive monograph on the identity and impact of different malarial parasites, Studi di uno Zoologo Sulla Malaria published in 1900 is as relevant today as it was in his time. In addition, his monograph also presented the first conclusive depiction that the bite of only female Anopheles mosquitoes could transmit malaria. In a classic experiment, he dispatched 112 volunteers to the Capaccio plains, a malaria-endemic area, protected them from mosquito bites between dusk and dawn, and they did not get malaria (except five of them) compared with 415 unprotected volunteers who all contracted malaria. In 1898 he and Bignami were able to produce the final proof of mosquito transmission of malaria when they fed local mosquitoes (A. claviger) on infected patients and found that uninfected individuals developed malaria through the mosquito bite.

=== Grassi's law ===
Grassi had developed a dogma that "there is no malaria without Anopheles" or simply, "anophelism without malaria". This was dubbed "Grassi's Law", which is formulated as: infected man + anopheles mosquitoes = malaria. Although the equation is straightforwardly correct, the reverse implication is not so. In many areas, he himself had noted that where anopheline vectors were abundant, malaria was not at all prevalent, and sometimes absent. This caused a little problem in understanding malaria epidemiology for some time. In fact, in 1919 he identified three typical malaria-prevalent localities which were not affected by malaria in the same way: the gardens of Schito near Naples, Massarosa in Tuscany, and Alberone in Lombardia.

Grassi discovered the problem with A. claviger at Schito, which was known to be a non-malarious region. He and his assistant spent several nights there in a peasant's hut, and was surprised that the mosquito never bit them. Inquiring from the local people, he learned that the mosquitos there never bit humans, but he was certain that the mosquitos were A. claviger. He remarked in his notebook: "One may conclude that the Anopheles of the Orti di Schito form a biological race which does not bite man." In 1921, after repeated assessment, he became convinced that there were races of the same mosquito species which were morphologically indistinguishable but do not bite humans and therefore did not play a role as vectors. The enigma was solved in 1925, soon after his death, by his pupil Falleroni, who demonstrated that there are six cryptic species, of which only four bite humans and transmit malaria.

=== Malaria control ===
Since 1900, the Italian government introduced health programmes on mass malaria control and enacted a "State Quinine Law" by which the antimalarial drug would be provided from the state resources. It was useful but not a great success, as the drug could not prevent the infection. Grassi was among the scientists who advocated the need to eradicate the vector mosquitos to put an end to continued transmission of the parasite. In 1918, he established what he called "malaria observatory" at Fiumicino, where he could monitor the extent of mosquitoes migrating and biting humans in the residential areas. At the time, those who advocated the mosquito eradication method believed that it would be sufficient to control the insect breeding places within the human habitations, such as the marsh area in the case of Fiumicino.

In an experiment, Grassi released a group of mosquitoes that he marked with paint. When he looked for the marked mosquitoes after several days, he found that many had strayed and survived in areas more than two miles away from the marsh. It was from this study that the necessity to treat the whole surrounding area of marshland beyond human dwellings was realised. For Fiumicino, Grassi designed an embankment system for the marsh area to prevent mosquito breeding, and that could be utilised for irrigation during summer. The project was initiated but uncompleted at the time of his death.

== The 1902 Nobel Prize controversy ==
The 1902 Nobel Prize in Physiology or Medicine was awarded to Ronald Ross for his discovery of the life cycle of the malarial parasite (or as the Nobel citation goes: for his work on malaria, by which he has shown how it enters the organism...). However, this was disputed and continues to be disputed to this day. Grassi was the first to suggest that there must be some developmental stage of Plasmodium in the white blood cells. In 1897, he and his associates established the developmental stages of malaria parasites in anopheline mosquitoes, and they described the complete life cycles of P. falciparum, P. vivax and P. malariae the following year. When the Nobel nomination was called, there began a fiery polemic over priority between him and Ross. The situation was worsened with the involvement of Robert Koch. The initial opinion of the Nobel Committee was that the prize should be shared between Ross and Grassi. Then Ross made a defamatory campaign, accusing Grassi of deliberate fraud. Koch was appointed as a "neutral arbitrator" in the committee, and as reported, "[He] threw the full weight of his considerable authority in insisting that Grassi did not deserve the honor" (Grassi would later point out flaws in Koch's own methodology on malarial research). Ross was the first to show that malarial parasite was transmitted by the bite of infected mosquitoes, in his case the avian Plasmodium relictum. But Grassi's work revealed that human malarial parasites were carried only by female Anopheles. He identified the mosquito species correctly, in his case P. claviger. By today's standards, they are likely to have shared the Nobel prize.

== Recognitions ==
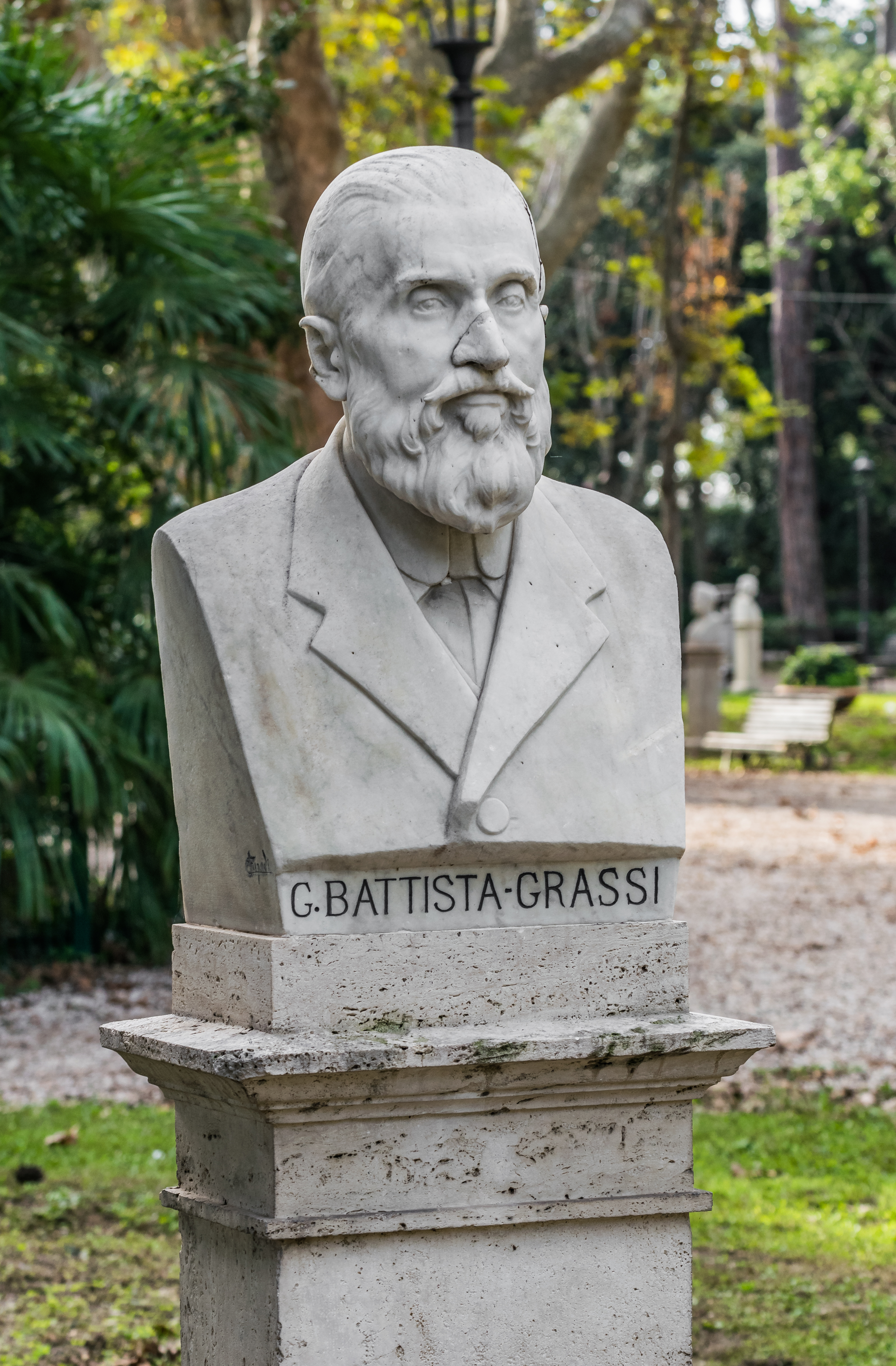
Statue of Grassi in the garden of Villa Borghese in Rome, Italy

Grassi was awarded the Royal Society's Darwin Medal in 1896 for his contribution to the study of termites. In 1908, he was made a senator of the Parliament of the Kingdom of Italy by King Victor Emmanuel III. He also received the Mary Kingsley Medal from the Liverpool School of Tropical Medicine, the Vallauri Prize from the Turin Academy of Sciences; the Royal Prize from the Accademia dei Lincei; the Gold Medal of the Apiculture Association; and the Gold Medal of the Agricultural Society of Italy. He received an honorary doctorate from Leipzig University and was elected to 24 scientific organisations.

A stamp commemorating Grassi with his portrait, a microscope and a mosquito on it was issued by the Italian post office in 1955.

His birthplace in Rovellasca has been turned into a social centre for the elderly, the front wall of which bears his bust, underneath which there is an inscription:

IN QUESTA CASA DEI SUOI AVI

NACQUE IL 27 MARZO 1854
BATTISTA GRASSI
MEDICO E MAESTRO SCIENZIATO E FILOSOFO
CONTESE ALLA BIOLOGIA I SUOI SEGRETI
NE TRASSE ARMI CONTRO LA FEBBRE PALUSTRE
INVANO COMBATTUTA DA SECOLI
MORTO A ROMA IL 4 MAGGIO 1925
VOLLE ESSERE SEPOLTO A FIUMICINO
FRA GLI UMILI LAVORATORI
DELLA MAREMMA E DELLA PALUDE
DI CUI AVEVA INIZIATO LA REDENZIONE
I SUOI CONCITTADINI DEDICANO
LAPIDE RINNOVATA E ONORATA
NEL I° CENTENARIO DELLA NASCITA
MENTRE NEL MONDO SI AVVERA
IL SUO SOGNO D'UMANA REDENZIONE
DAL SECOLARE FLAGELLO MALARICO
27 MARZO 1954

[Translated as: IN THIS HOME OF HIS ANCESTORS/27 MARCH 1854 WAS BORN/BATTISTA GRASSI/PHYSICIAN AND EXCELLENT SCIENTIST AND PHILOSOPHER/ CONTENTIONS TO BIOLOGY /HE TOOK ARMS AGAINST MARSH FEVER/UNSUCCESSFULLY FOUGHT FOR CENTURIES/DIED IN ROME ON 4 MAY 1925/WANTED TO BE BURIED AT FIUMICINO/BETWEEN THE HUMBLE WORKERS OF MAREMMA AND MARSH/OF WHICH HE HAD STARTED THE REDEMPTION/HIS TOWNSMEN DEDICATE/TOMBSTONE AND HONOURED/IN THE CENTENARY OF HIS BIRTH /WHEN THE WORLD COMES TRUE/HIS HUMAN DREAM OF REDEMPTION/FROM THE AGE-OLD SCOURGE OF MALARIA/27 MARCH 1954]

== Bibliography (partial list) ==
Grassi authored more than 250 scientific papers and, in collaboration with his students and colleagues, wrote another 100.

- 1898. Rapporti tra la malaria e peculiari insetti (zanzaroni e zanzare palustri). R. C. Accad. Lincei 7:163–177.
- 1899. Ancora sulla malaria. R. C. Accad. Lincei 8:559–561.
- with Bignami, A. and Bastianelli, G.. 1899. Resoconto degli studi fatti sulla malaria durante il mese di gennaio. R. C. Accad. Lincei. 8:100–104.
- 1901. Studii di uno Zoologo sulla Malaria. Atti dei.Linncei.Mem. Cl.sc.fis.ecc.3(5), No. 91:299–516.6 plates in colour.
