= Raimondo Feletti =

Italian physician and zoologist

Raimondo Feletti (1851–1927) was an Italian physician and zoologist.

Feletti worked at a clinic in Catania where a street is named for him "Via Raimondo Feletti".With Giovanni Batista Grassi he published several works on malarial parasites in birds. They described, and introduced the names Haemamoeba vivax (1890) and H. malariae (1889) for, two of the malaria parasites, soon revising the genus to Plasmodium. In 1889 Grassi and Feletti, as an honor to Laveran, proposed the genus name Laverania . It is now a subgenus of Plasmodium.

== Works ==
- With Grassi, B., 1889, 1890. Sui parassiti della malaria. Rif. Med. 6 : 62-64. (The 1889 paper was a preprint of the 1890 paper according to Hemming, 1954).
- With Grassi, B., 1890. Parasites malariques chez les oiseaux. Arch. Ital. de Biologie 13 : 297-300.
- With Grassi, B., 1892. Contribuzione allo studio die parassiti malarici. Atti Accad. Gioenia. Series 4,5 : 1-81.
