= Schüffner's dots =

Clinical sign

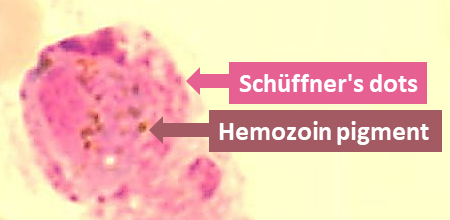
Plasmodium ovale microgametocyte in Giemsa-stained thin blood film, with annotated Schüffner's dots and hemozoin pigment

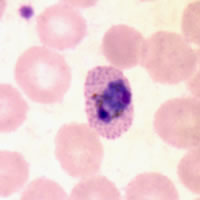
Trophozoites of P. ovale in thin blood smears. Schüffner's dots can be seen.

Schüffner's dots refers to a hematological finding that is associated with malaria, exclusively found in infections caused by Plasmodium ovale or Plasmodium vivax.

Plasmodium vivax induces morphologic alterations in infected host erythrocytes that are visible by light microscopy in Romanowsky-stained blood smears as multiple brick-red dots. These morphologic changes, referred to as Schüffner's dots, are important in the identification of this species of malarial parasite and have been associated by electron microscopy with caveolavesicle complexes along the erythrocyte plasmalemma.

They are named for Wilhelm Schüffner, who described them in 1904.
