= Plasmodium ovalewallikeri =

Scientific classification
- Domain: Eukaryota
- Clade: Sar
- Clade: Alveolata
- Phylum: Apicomplexa
- Class: Aconoidasida
- Order: Haemospororida
- Family: Plasmodiidae
- Genus: Plasmodium
- Species: P. ovalewallikeri

Binomial name
- Plasmodium ovalewallikeri Snounou et al. 2024

Species of single-celled organism

Plasmodium ovalewallikeri is a species of parasitic protozoa that causes tertian malaria in humans. The species was described in 2010 when it was established that the two species of Plasmodium ovale, while morphologically identical are genetically distinct. Originally given the trinomial name Plasmodium ovale wallikeri, following further evidence for its distinct species status it was assigned the appropriate binomial nomenclature in 2024

== Epidemiology ==
Plasmodium ovalewallikeri has been identified in Ghana, Myanmar, Nigeria, São Tomé, Sierra Leone and Uganda.

== Clinical features ==
Clinical features for P. ovalewallikeri are described in the article on Plasmodium ovale.

== Phylogenetics ==
This species separated from its closest known relative - Plasmodium ovalecurtisi - between 1.0 and 3.5 million years ago.
