= Attractive toxic sugar baits =

Experimental oral insecticide for mosquitos

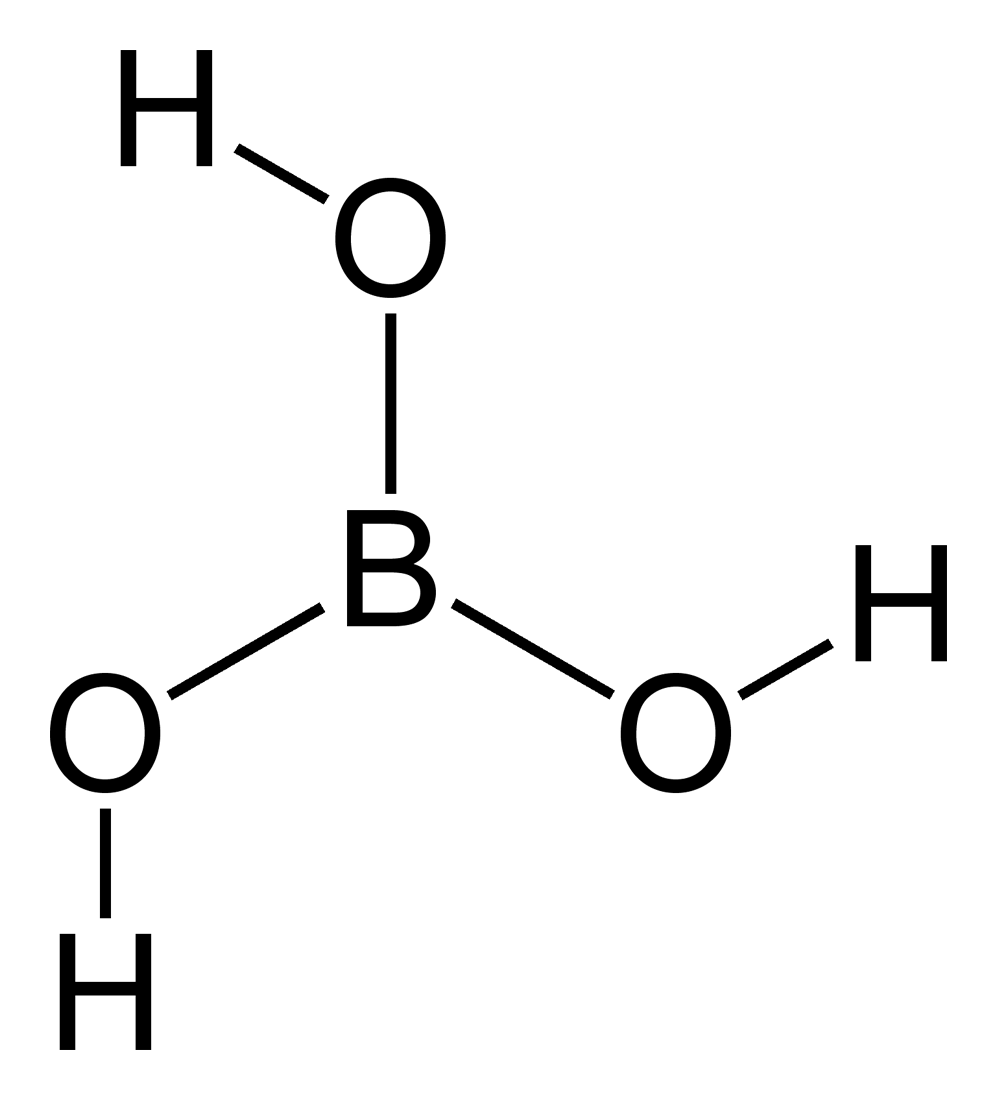
A molecule of boric acid, the oral toxin used in many ATSB solutions

Attractive toxic sugar baits (ATSBs) are oral insecticides designed to reduce malaria infections by killing the host vector – the mosquito – rather than the parasite itself.

Attractive toxic sugar baits are manufactured from readily available, inexpensive ingredients in tropical and sub-tropical areas. They broadly consist of an oral toxic component, a sugar component to encourage feeding on the ATSB, and a scented component attractive to mosquitos or other target vectors. Typical ATSBs consist of boric acid as the oral toxin, unrefined cane sugar as the sugar source, and fruit, flowers, seeds and other scented material taken from local plants known to be popular feeding sources for mosquitos.

Mosquitoes require sugar as their main source of energy. By mimicking the scent of sugar-providing plants that are naturally attractive to mosquitoes, it is possible to attract the mosquitoes to insecticide-laden traps. The traps can be set next to areas with significant mosquito populations (e.g., reservoirs, roadside drainage ponds and culverts). This use of traps attractive to mosquitoes prevents the need for indiscriminate insecticide spraying.

Attractive toxic sugar bait sprayed on vegetation has been successful in controlling Anopheles mosquitoes in outdoor environments. Additionally, indoor ATSB shows promise as a supplement to mosquito nets for controlling mosquitoes. Indoor ATSB constitute a novel application method for insecticide classes that act as stomach poisons and have not hitherto been exploited for mosquito control. Combined with long lasting insecticidal nets (LLINs), indoor use of ATSB has the potential to serve as a strategy for managing insecticide resistance. Mortality rates of indoor ATSB were comparable to LLINs previously tested against the same species in the same area.

Boric acid is only marginally more toxic to most lifeforms than normal table salt, with exposure in humans and other mammals widely regarded as being safe. Its use as an insecticide in malarial control (instead of compounds which demonstrate high levels of mammalian toxicity or carcinogenicity) is thus seen as advantageous.

ATSBs can affect insects that are not the target. In one instance, bees collected sugar from attractive non-toxic sugar baits dyed with food coloring, and the honey they produced was a different color. To avoid killing bees, it has been suggested that the ATSBs could have nets to keep the bees out, while letting harmful insects to fall for the baits.
