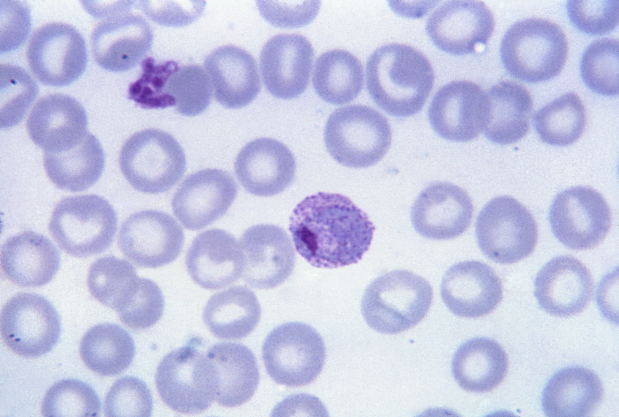
- Mature P. vivax trophozoite

Scientific classification
- Domain: Eukaryota
- Clade: Sar
- Clade: Alveolata
- Phylum: Apicomplexa
- Class: Aconoidasida
- Order: Haemospororida
- Family: Plasmodiidae
- Genus: Plasmodium
- Species: P. vivax

Binomial name
- Plasmodium vivax (Grassi & Feletti, 1890)

Synonyms
- Haemamoeba vivax Grassi and Feletti, 1890; Plasmodium malariae tertianae Celli and Sanfelice, 1891; Haemamoeba laverani var. tertiana Labbe, 1894(?); Haemosporidium tertianae Lewkowicz, 1897; Plasmodium camarense Ziemann, 1915

= Plasmodium vivax =

Species of single-celled organism

Plasmodium vivax is a protozoal parasite and a human pathogen. This parasite is the most frequent and widely distributed cause of recurring malaria. Although it is less virulent than Plasmodium falciparum, the deadliest of the five human malaria parasites, P. vivax malaria infections can lead to severe disease and death, often due to splenomegaly (a pathologically enlarged spleen). P. vivax is carried by the female Anopheles mosquito; the males do not bite.

== Biology ==
=== Life cycle ===
Like all malaria parasites, P. vivax has a complex life cycle. It infects a definitive insect host, where sexual reproduction occurs, and an intermediate vertebrate host, where asexual amplification occurs. In P. vivax, the definitive hosts are Anopheles mosquitoes (also known as the vector), while humans are the intermediate asexual hosts. During its life cycle, P. vivax assumes various different physical forms (see below).

Asexual forms:

- Sporozoite: Transfers infection from mosquito to human
- Immature trophozoites (ring or signet-ring shaped), about one-third of the diameter of a red blood cell.
- Mature trophozoites: Very irregular and delicate (described as amoeboid); many pseudopodial processes seen. The presence of fine grains of brown pigment (malarial pigment) or hematin is probably derived from the haemoglobin of the infected red blood cell.
- Schizonts (also called meronts): As large as a normal red cell; thus the parasitized corpuscle becomes distended and larger than normal. There are about sixteen merozoites.

Sexual forms:

- Gametocytes: Round. P. vivax gametocytes are commonly found in human peripheral blood at about the end of the first week of parasitemia.
- Gametes: Formed from gametocytes in mosquitoes.
- Zygote: Formed from combination of gametes
- Oocyst: Contains zygote, develops into sporozoites

==== Human infection ====
P. vivax human infection occurs when an infected mosquito feeds on a human. During feeding, the mosquito injects saliva, along with sporozoites, through the skin. A proportion of these sporozoites reach the liver. There they enter hepatic cells, on which they feed, and reproduce asexually, as described in the next section. This process gives rise to thousands of merozoites (plasmodial daughter cells) in the body.

The incubation period of human infection usually ranges from ten to seventeen days and sometimes up to a year. Persistent liver stages allow relapse up to five years after the elimination of red blood cell stages and clinical cure.

===== Liver stage =====
The P. vivax sporozoite enters a hepatocyte and begins its exoerythrocytic schizogony stage. This is characterized by multiple rounds of nuclear division without cellular segmentation. After several nuclear divisions, the parasite cell will segment, and merozoites are formed.

There are situations where some of the sporozoites do not immediately start to grow and divide after entering the hepatocyte, but remain in a dormant, hypnozoite stage for weeks or months. The duration of latency is thought to be variable from one hypnozoite to another and the factors that will eventually trigger growth are not known; this might explain how a single infection can be responsible for a series of waves of parasitaemia or "relapses". It has been assumed that different strains of P. vivax have their own characteristic relapse pattern and timing.

However, such recurrent parasitemia is probably being over-attributed to hypnozoite activation. Two newly recognized, non-hypnozoite, probable contributing sources to recurrent peripheral P. vivax parasitemia are erythrocytic forms in bone marrow and the spleen. Between 2018 and 2021, it was reported that vast numbers of non-circulating, non-hypnozoite parasites occur unobtrusively in tissues of P. vivax-infected people, with only a small proportion of the total parasite biomass present in the peripheral bloodstream. This finding supports an intellectually insightful, paradigm-shifting viewpoint, which had prevailed since 2011 (albeit not believed between 2011 and 2018 by most malariologists and therefore ignored), that an unknown percentage of P. vivax recurrences are recrudescences (having a non-circulating or sequestered merozoite origin), and not relapses (which have a hypnozoite source). The recent discoveries concerning bodily parasite biomass distribution did not give rise to this new theory; it was pre-existing, as explained above. The recent bone marrow and spleen, etc., findings merely confirm the likely validity of the theory.

===== Erythrocytic cycle =====
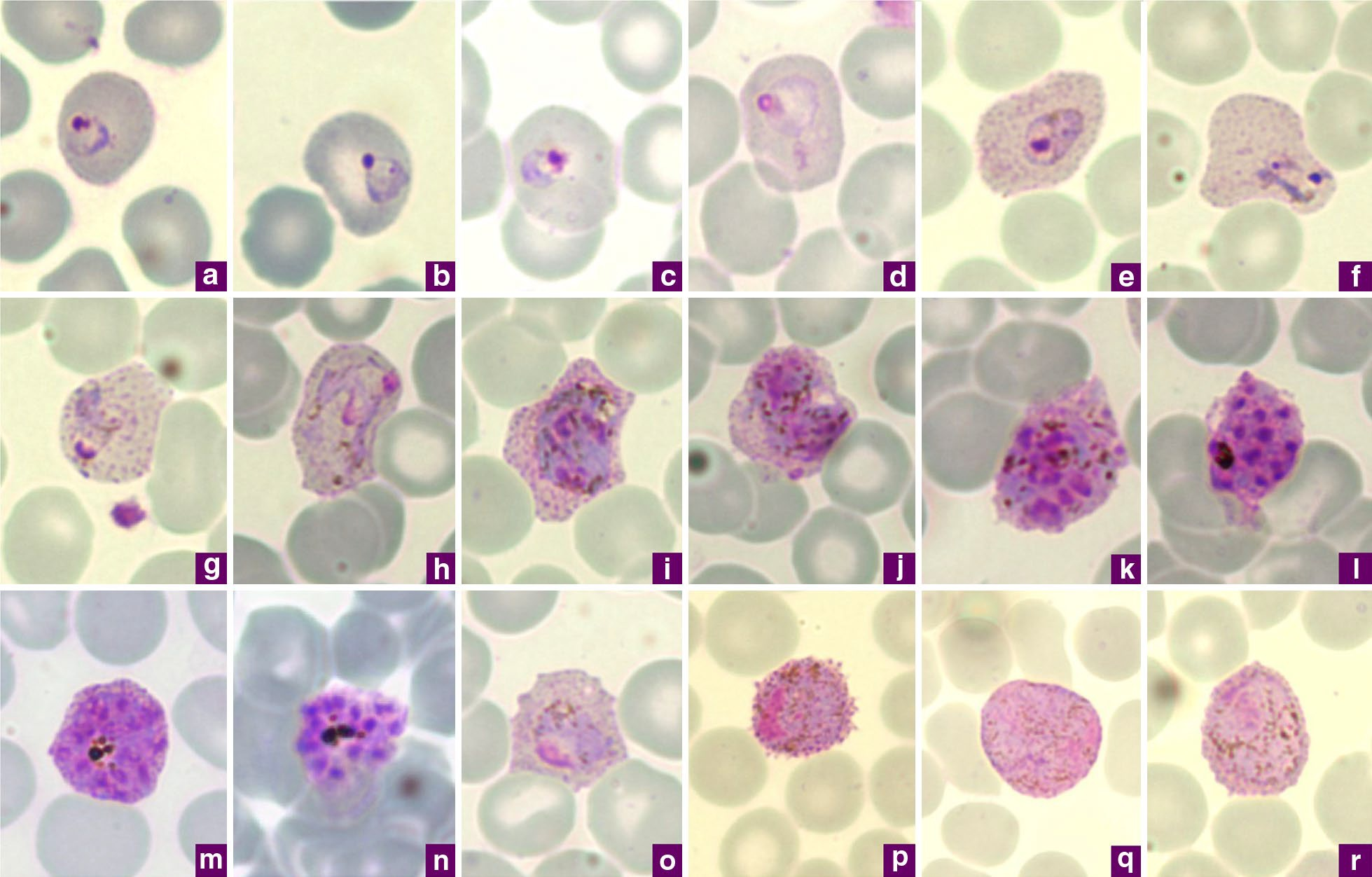
Photomicrographs of Plasmodium vivax in Giemsa-stained thin blood films. a, b ring stages, c–e young trophozoites, f–h amoeboid trophozoites, i young schizont, j–l growing schizonts, m developed schizont, n mature schizont, o young gametocyte, p macroga‑metocyte, r, q microgametocytes.

P. vivax preferentially penetrates young red blood cells (reticulocytes), unlike Plasmodium falciparum which can invade erythrocytes. In order to achieve this, merozoites have two proteins at their apical pole (PvRBP-1 and PvRBP-2). The parasite uses the Duffy blood group antigens (Fy6) to penetrate red blood cells. This antigen does not occur in the majority of humans in West Africa [phenotype Fy (a-b-)]. As a result, P. vivax occurs less frequently in West Africa.

The parasitised red blood cell is up to twice as large as a normal red cell and Schüffner's dots (also known as Schüffner's stippling or Schüffner's granules) are seen on the infected cell's surface. Schüffner's dots have a spotted appearance, varying in color from light pink to red, to red-yellow, as coloured with Romanovsky stains. The parasite within it is often wildly irregular in shape (described as "amoeboid"). Schizonts of P. vivax have up to twenty merozoites within them. It is rare to see cells with more than one parasite within them. Merozoites will only attach to immature blood cells (reticulocytes) and therefore it is unusual to see more than 3% of all circulating erythrocytes parasitised.

Unusual erythrocytic forms were detected in a few cases of an outbreak in Brazil.

==== Mosquito stage ====
Parasite life cycle in mosquitoes includes all stages of sexual reproduction:

1. Infection and Gametogenesis
  - Microgametes
  - Macrogametes
2. Fertilization
3. Ookinite
4. Oocyst
5. Sporogony

===== Mosquito infection and gamete formation =====
When a female Anopheles mosquito bites an infected person, gametocytes and other stages of the parasite are transferred to the mosquito's stomach. Gametocytes ultimately develop into gametes, a process known as gametogony.

Microgametocytes become very active, and their nuclei undergo fission (i.e., amitosis) to each give 6-8 daughter nuclei, which become arranged at the periphery. The cytoplasm develops long thin flagella-like projections, then a nucleus enters into each one of these extensions. These cytoplasmic extensions later break off as mature male gametes (microgametes). This process of formation of flagella-like microgametes or male gametes is known as exflagellation. Macrogametocytes show very little change. They develop a cone of reception at one side and become mature as macrogametocytes (female gametes).

===== Fertilization =====
Male gametes move actively in the stomach of mosquitoes in search of female gametes. Male gametes then enter into female gametes through the cone of reception. The complete fusion of 2 gametes results in the formation of a zygote. Here, the fusion of 2 dissimilar gametes occurs, known as anisogamy.

The zygote remains inactive for some time but it soon elongates and becomes vermiform (worm-like) and motile. It is now known as an ookinete. The pointed ends of the ookinete penetrate the stomach wall and come to lie below its outer epithelial layer. Here the zygote becomes spherical and develops a cyst wall around itself. The cyst wall is derived partly from the stomach tissues and partly produced by the zygote itself. At this stage, the zygote is known as an oocyst. The oocyst absorbs nourishment and grows in size. Oocysts protrude from the surface of the stomach, giving it a blistered appearance. In a highly infected mosquito, as many as 1000 oocysts may be seen.

===== Sporogony =====
The oocyst nucleus divides repeatedly to form a large number of daughter nuclei. At the same time, the cytoplasm develops large vacuoles and forms numerous cytoplasmic masses. These cytoplasmic masses then elongate and a daughter nuclei migrate into each mass. The resulting sickle-shaped bodies are known as sporozoites. This phase of asexual multiplication is known as sporogony and is completed in about 10–21 days. The oocyst then bursts and sporozoites are released into the body cavity of mosquitoes. Sporozoites eventually reach the salivary glands of mosquitoes via its hemolymph. The mosquito now becomes infectious. The salivary glands of a single infected mosquito may contain as many as 200,000 sporozoites. When the mosquito bites a healthy person, thousands of sporozoites are injected into the blood along with the saliva and the cycle starts again.

=== Taxonomy ===
P. vivax can be divided into two clades: one that appears to have origins in the Old World and a second that originated in the New World. The distinction can be made based on the structure of the A and S forms of the rRNA. A rearrangement of these genes appears to have occurred in the New World strains. It appears that a gene conversion occurred in an Old World strain and this strain gave rise to the New World strains. The timing of this event has yet to be established.

At present, both types of P. vivax circulate in the Americas. The monkey parasite – Plasmodium simium – is related to the Old World strains rather than to the New World strains.

A specific name – Plasmodium collinsi – has been proposed for the New World strains, but this suggestion has not been accepted to date.

=== Miscellaneous ===
It has been suggested that P. vivax has horizontally acquired genetic material from humans.

Plasmodium vivax is not known to have a particular Gram stain (negative vs. positive) and may appear as either.

There is evidence that P. vivax is itself infected by viruses.

== Health ==
Number of deaths from malaria ghe

=== Epidemiology ===
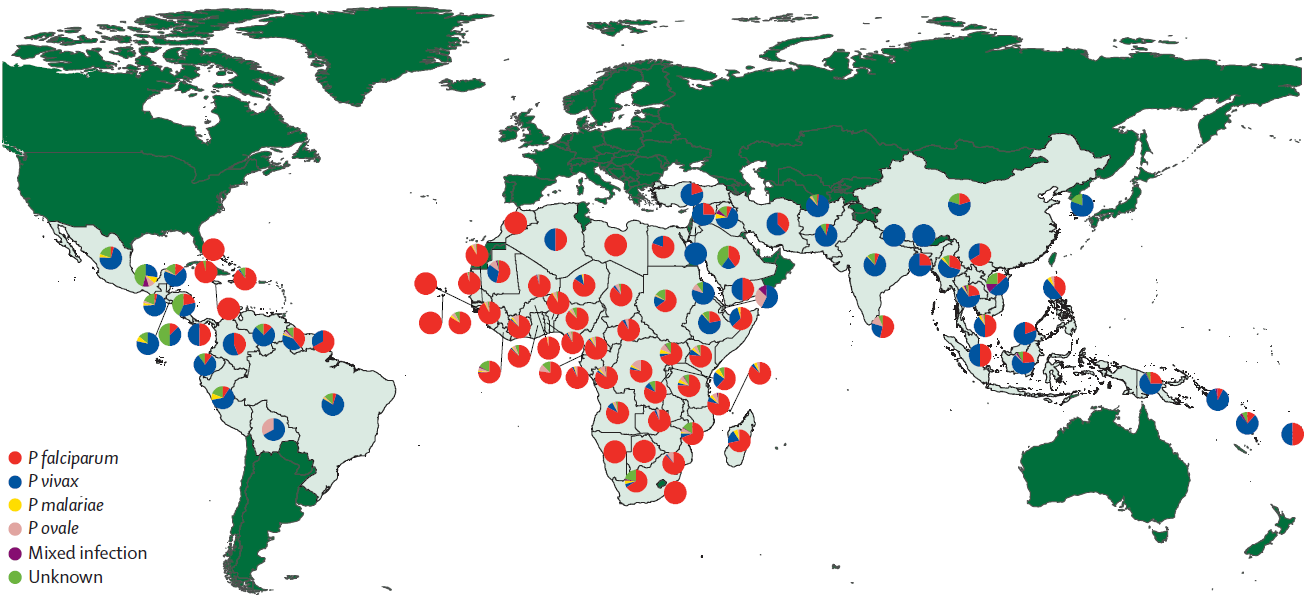
Relative incidence of Plasmodium species by country of origin for imported cases to non-endemic countries, showing P. vivax (in blue) predominating in areas including Asia and mainland America.

Plasmodium vivax is found mainly in Asia, Latin America, and in some parts of Africa. P. vivax is believed to have originated in Asia, but recent studies have shown that wild chimpanzees and gorillas throughout central Africa are endemically infected with parasites that are closely related to human P. vivax. These findings indicate that human P. vivax is of African origin. Plasmodium vivax accounts for 65% of malaria cases in Asia and South America. Unlike Plasmodium falciparum, Plasmodium vivax is capable of undergoing sporogonic development in the mosquito at lower temperatures. It has been estimated that 2.5 billion people are at risk of infection with this organism.

Although the Americas contribute 22% of the global area at risk, high endemic areas are generally sparsely populated and the region contributes only 6% to the total population at risk. In Africa, the widespread lack of the Duffy antigen in the population has ensured that stable transmission is constrained to Madagascar and parts of the Horn of Africa. It contributes 3.5% of the global population at risk. Central Asia is responsible for 82% of the global population at risk with high endemic areas coinciding with dense populations particularly in India and Myanmar. South East Asia has areas of high endemicity in Indonesia and Papua New Guinea and overall contributes 9% of the global population at risk. In 2019, Khadijetou Lekweiry reported the first appearance of the parasite in Atar, a town in the north of Mauritania.

P. vivax is carried by at least 71 mosquito species. Many vivax vectors thrive in temperate climates—as far north as Finland. Some prefer to bite outdoors or during the daytime, hampering the effectiveness of indoor insecticide and bed nets. Several key vector species have yet to be grown in the lab for closer study, and insecticide resistance is unquantified.

=== Clinical presentation ===
Pathogenesis results from the rupture of infected red blood cells, leading to fever. Infected red blood cells may also stick to each other and walls of capillaries. Vessels plug up and deprive tissues of oxygen. Infection may also cause the spleen to enlarge.

Unlike P. falciparum, P. vivax can populate the bloodstream, even before a patient shows symptoms, with sexual-stage parasites—the form ingested by mosquitoes before biting the next victim. Consequently, prompt treatment of symptomatic patients does not necessarily help stop an outbreak, as it does with falciparum malaria, in which fevers occur as sexual stages develop. Even when symptoms appear, because the disease is usually not immediately fatal, the parasite continues to multiply.

Plasmodium vivax can cause a more unusual form of malaria with atypical symptoms. It has been known to debut with hiccups, loss of taste, lack of fever, pain while swallowing, cough and urinary discomfort.

The parasite can lie dormant in the liver for days to years, causing no symptoms and remaining undetectable in blood tests. They form hypnozoites, a small stage that nestles inside an individual liver cell. This name derives from "sleeping organisms". The hypnozoites allow the parasite to survive in more temperate zones, where mosquitoes bite only part of the year.

A single infectious bite can trigger six or more relapses a year, leaving patients more vulnerable to other diseases. Other infectious diseases, including falciparum malaria, appear to trigger relapses.

=== Serious complications ===
Serious complications for malaria are dormant liver stage parasites, organ failures such as acute kidney failure. More complications of malaria can also be impairment of consciousness, neurological abnormalities, hypoglycemia and low blood pressures caused by cardiovascular collapse, clinical jaundice, and or other vital organ dysfunctions and coagulation defects. The most serious complication ultimately is death.

=== Prevention ===
The main way to prevent malaria is through vector control. There are mostly three main forms in which the vector can be controlled: (1) insecticide-treated mosquito nets, (2) indoor residual spraying, and (3) antimalarial drugs. Long-lasting insecticidal nets (LLNs) are the preferred method of control because it is the most cost-effective. The WHO is currently strategizing how to ensure that the net is properly maintained to protect people at risk. The second option is indoor residual spraying which has been proven effective if at least 80% of the homes are sprayed. However, such a method is only effective for 3–6 months. A drawback to these two methods, unfortunately, is that mosquito resistance against these insecticides has risen. National malaria control efforts are undergoing rapid changes to ensure that people are given the most effective method of vector control. Lastly, antimalarial drugs can also be used to prevent infection from developing into a clinical disease. However, there has also been an increase in resistance to antimalarial medicine.

In 2015 the World Health Organization (WHO) drew up a plan to address vivax malaria, as part of their Global Technical Strategy for Malaria.

=== Diagnosis ===
P. vivax and P. ovale that has been sitting in EDTA for more than 30 minutes before the blood film is made will look very similar in appearance to P. malariae,[source needed] which is an important reason to warn the laboratory immediately when the blood sample is drawn so they can process the sample as soon as it arrives. Blood films are preferably made within 30 minutes of the blood draw and must certainly be made within an hour of the blood being drawn. Diagnosis can be done with the strip fast test of antibodies.

=== Treatment ===
Chloroquine remains the treatment of choice for vivax malaria, except in Indonesia's Irian Jaya (Western New Guinea) region and the geographically contiguous Papua New Guinea, where chloroquine resistance is common (up to 20% resistance). Chloroquine resistance is an increasing problem in other parts of the world, such as Korea and India.

When chloroquine resistance is common or when chloroquine is contraindicated, then artesunate is the drug of choice, except in the U.S., where it is not approved for use. Where an artemisinin-based combination therapy has been adopted as the first-line treatment for P. falciparum malaria, it may also be used for P. vivax malaria in combination with primaquine for radical cure. An exception is artesunate plus sulfadoxine-pyrimethamine (AS+SP), which is not effective against P. vivax in many places. Mefloquine is a good alternative and in some countries is more readily available. Atovaquone-proguanil is an effective alternative in patients unable to tolerate chloroquine. Quinine may be used to treat vivax malaria but is associated with inferior outcomes.

32–100% of patients will relapse following successful treatment of P. vivax infection if a radical cure (inactivation of liver stages) is not given.

Eradication of the liver stages is achieved by giving primaquine but patients with glucose-6-phosphate dehydrogenase deficiency are at risk for haemolysis. G6PD-testing is therefore very important, both in endemic areas and in travelers. At least a 14-day course of primaquine is required for the radical treatment of P. vivax malaria.

The idea that primaquine kills parasites in the liver is the traditional assumption. However, it has been suggested that primaquine might, to a currently unknown extent, also inactivate noncirculating, extrahepatic merozoites (clarity in this regard is expected to be forthcoming soon).

==== Tafenoquine ====
In 2013 a Phase IIb trial was completed that studied a single-dose alternative drug named tafenoquine. It is an 8-aminoquinoline, of the same family as primaquine, developed by researchers at the Walter Reed Army Institute of Research in the 1970s and tested in safety trials. It languished, however, until the push for malaria elimination sparked new interest in primaquine alternatives.

Among patients who received a 600-mg dose, 91% were relapse-free after 6 months. Among patients who received primaquine, 24% relapsed within 6 months. "The data are absolutely spectacular," Wells says. Ideally, he says, researchers will be able to combine the safety data from the Army's earlier trials with the new study in a submission to the U.S. Food and Drug Administration for approval. Like primaquine, tafenoquine causes hemolysis in people who are G6PD deficient.

In 2013 researchers produced cultured human "microlivers" that supported liver stages of both P. falciparum and P. vivax and may have also created hypnozoites.

=== Eradication ===
Mass-treating populations with primaquine can kill the hypnozoites, exempting those with G6PD deficiency. However, the standard regimen requires a daily pill for 14 days across an asymptomatic population.

==== Korea ====
P. vivax is the only indigenous malaria parasite on the Korean peninsula. In the years following the Korean War (1950–53), malaria eradication campaigns successfully reduced the number of new cases of the disease in North Korea and South Korea. In 1979, World Health Organization declared the Korean peninsula vivax malaria-free, but the disease unexpectedly re-emerged in the late 1990s and persists today. Several factors contributed to the re-emergence of the disease, including a reduced emphasis on malaria control after 1979, floods and famine in North Korea, the emergence of drug resistance, and possibly global warming. Most cases are identified along the Korean Demilitarized Zone. As such, vivax malaria offers the two Koreas an opportunity to work together on an important health problem that affects both countries.

=== Drug targets ===
Given that drugs that target the various life stages of the parasite can sometimes have undesirable side effects, it is desirable to come up with drug molecules targeting specific proteins/enzymes that are essential for the parasite's survival or that can compromise the fitness of the organism. Enzymes in the purine salvage pathway had been favorite targets to this end. However, given the high degree of conservation in purine metabolism across the parasite and its host, there could be potential cross-reactivity making it difficult to design selective drugs against the parasite. To overcome this, recent efforts have focused on deducing the function of orphan hypothetical proteins whose functions have been unknown. Though, a lot of the hypothetical proteins have role in secondary metabolism, targeting them will be beneficial from two perspectives, i.e., specificity and reducing the virulence of the pathogen with no or minimal undesirable cross-reactivities.

== Therapeutic use ==
P. vivax was used between 1917 and the 1940s for malariotherapy, that is, to create very high fevers to combat certain diseases such as tertiary syphilis. In 1917, the inventor of this technique, Julius Wagner-Jauregg, received the Nobel Prize in Physiology or Medicine for his discoveries. However, the technique was dangerous, killing about 15% of patients, so it is no longer in use.

== See also ==
- List of parasites (human)
- Apicomplexan life cycle
- Gametocyte
- Host (biology)
