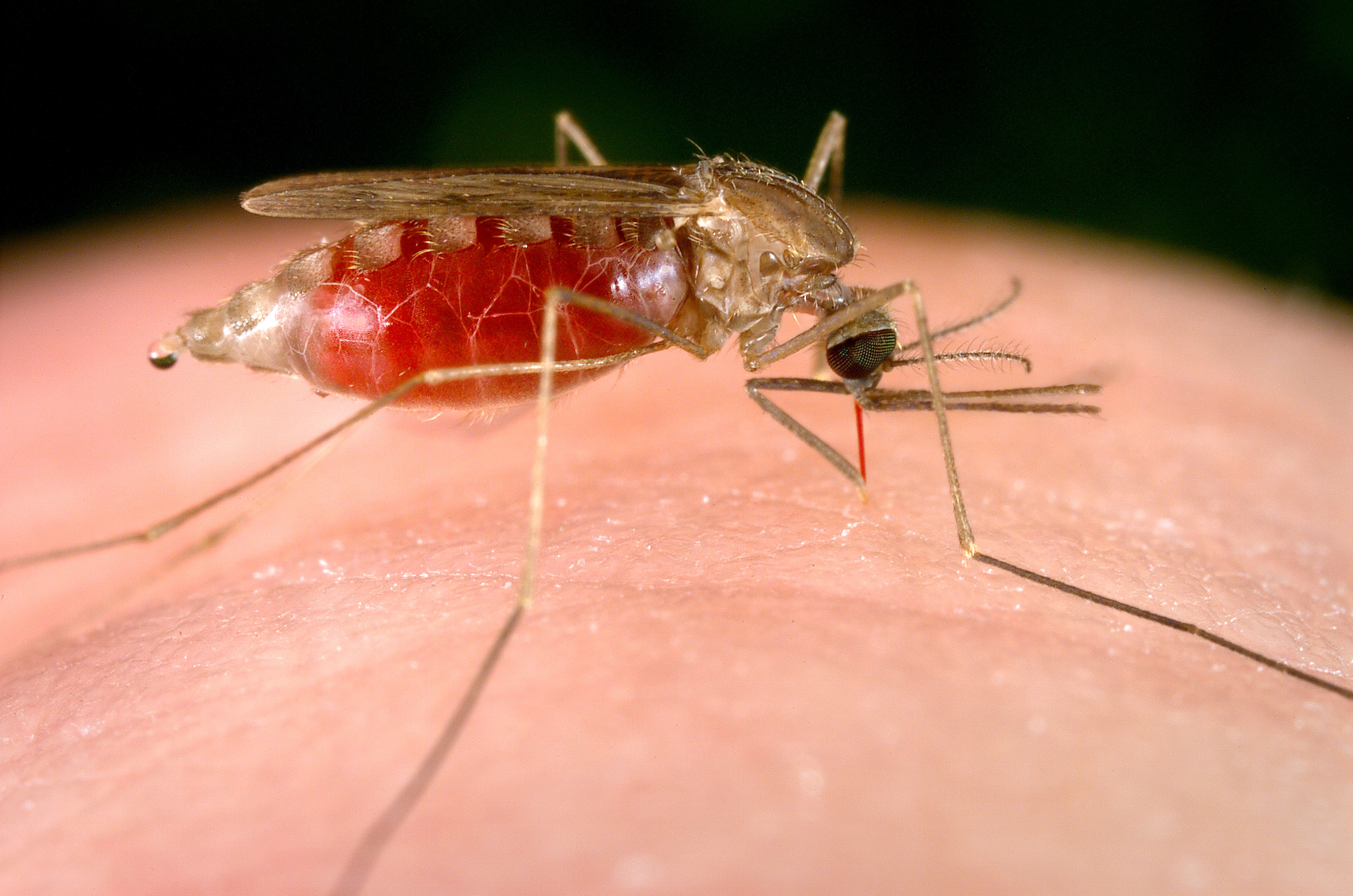
- Anopheles freeborni feeding on blood from a human finger

Scientific classification
- Kingdom: Animalia
- Phylum: Arthropoda
- Clade: Pancrustacea
- Class: Insecta
- Order: Diptera
- Family: Culicidae
- Genus: Anopheles
- Subgenus: Anopheles
- Species: A. freeborni

Binomial name
- Anopheles freeborni Aitken

= Anopheles freeborni =

Species of Mosquito

Anopheles freeborni, commonly known as the western malaria mosquito, is a species of mosquito in the family Culicidae. It is typically found in the western United States and Canada. Adults are brown to black, with yellow-brown hairs and gray-brown stripes on the thorax. Their scaly wings have four dark spots, which are less distinct in the male.

Male Anopheles freeborni aggregate into swarms to attract potential mates. Females are able to overwinter, allowing for seasonal development of eggs in the spring.

The western malaria mosquito feeds on bloodmeals. Within the United States’ regions of semiarid or arid climate, it has been historically identified as the primary transmission vector for malaria. It was most notably involved in the malaria outbreaks of northern California during the turn of the 20th century.

== Description ==
Adult A. freeborni are medium-sized with overall brown to black coloration. They possess a dark proboscis as well as palpi of similar length to the proboscis on their heads. The head is covered in erect scales, dark-colored at the posterior, yellow-white at the center, and light at the vertex. They also have a frontal tuft composed of several light-colored setae.

Adults have a gray-brown prescutellar space and brown to black scutum, which possesses hairs of light yellow to golden-brown coloration. The central area of the scutum has gray-brown stripes and the highest density of hairs. The sickle-shaped scutellum also has similarly colored hairs and setae. The thorax has setae on the pre-spiracular area, but not on the post-spiracular area. The adult abdomen is brown to black, also with hairs of yellow-brown coloration.

Their legs have primarily dark scales, with lighter-colored scales at their tips. They possess wings of about 4.5 mm in length, covered in dark scales, with four spots formed by even darker-colored scales. These spots are less noticeable on males’ wings. The media and radial sector of their wings' backsides have tapered scales, which is unique to the species.

== Distribution ==
The western malaria mosquito is present throughout North America, predominantly in the western United States and British Columbia, Canada. While most common in the United States and Canada, it has also been observed in Mexico. It typically remains west of the Rocky Mountains, but the mosquito has been observed slightly eastward in Texas, New Mexico, and southern Colorado. They are thought to be most populous in California, particularly the valleys of San Joaquin and Sacramento. An. freeborni have been collected in southern California.

== Habitat ==
Larvae are found in stagnant water; noted larval habitats include rice fields, pools along roads, and groundwater, with particularly significant larval production in algal masses surrounding rice fields. Vegetative cover is highly sought after in selection of larval habitats.

Adults typically reside in cool, shaded areas in the daytime, such as drainage tunnels, dark corners of homes, or beneath bridges. One study in California found hibernating A. freeborni in the nests of wood rats. Females typically overwinter in human structures, such as basements, houses, garages, and barns. They do not remain in one location during overwintering, instead traveling to different shelters throughout the winter.

== Phylogeny ==
Anopheles freeborni is part of the genus Anopheles. It is most closely phylogenetically related to the species Anopheles hermsi. It belongs to the Angusticorn section, the Maculipennis group, and the Freeborni subgroup, which also includes the species A. hermsi, A. occidentalis, and A. earlei.

== Flight patterns ==
Flight patterns of A. freeborni remain in close proximity to breeding sites in the summertime. Prehibernation flights, during which individuals disperse from breeding sites, take place in September. These flights are commonly five to ten miles (8 to 16 km) in distance, although flights as long as 17.5 miles (28 km) have been recorded. When the temperature sufficiently rises during hibernation, flights are restricted to movement between local shelters. In February, females begin their return to habitats favoring larval development for oviposition.

== Life history ==
Anopheles freeborni undergo four stages of development, as do all other Anopheles. The entire development process takes about 20 days.

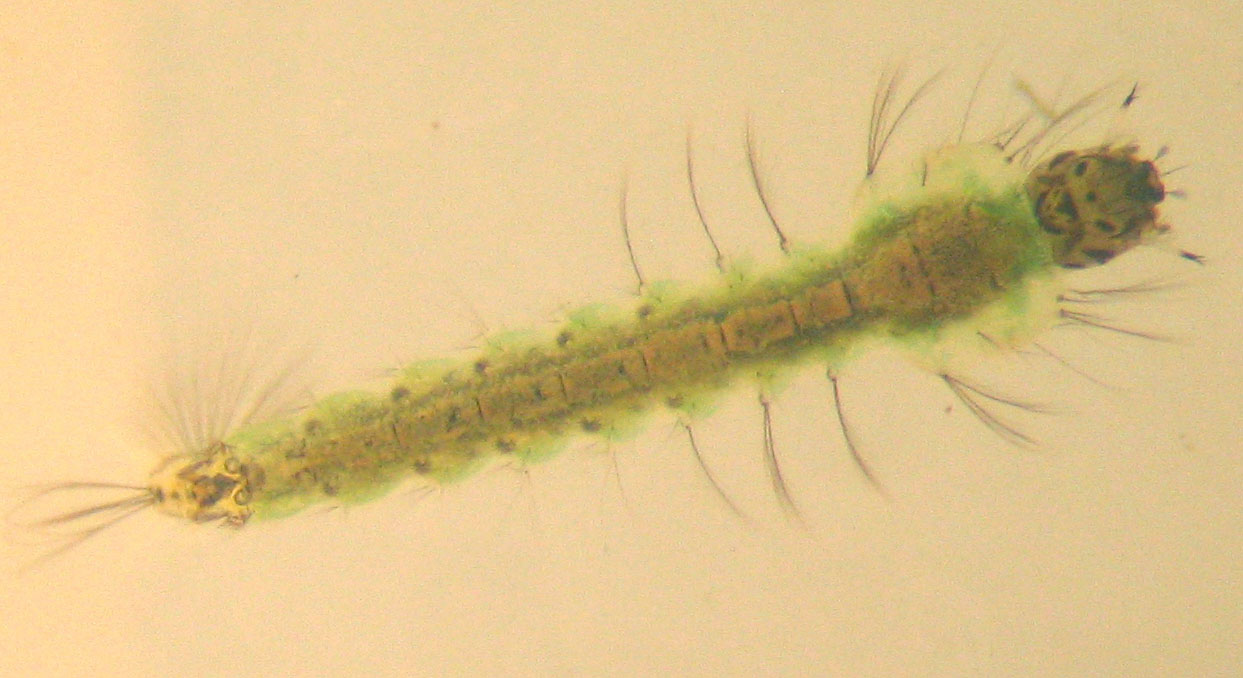
Anopheles sp. larva

=== Egg ===
During the egg, larva, and pupa stages, the mosquito is aquatic. Eggs are deposited directly into still bodies of water, where they float. Hatching may occur as soon as two to three days after oviposition, although it may take several weeks depending on environmental temperature.

=== Larva ===
In contrast with other mosquitoes, Anopheles larvae are horizontally situated directly underneath the water surface. As larvae, all Anopheles mosquitoes develop a head, thorax, and abdomen, but no legs. They have spiracles on their abdomen, which allows them to breathe at the water surface. After four larval instars, each succeeded by molting, they transform into pupae. This process takes approximately 15 days.

=== Pupa ===
Anopheles pupae transform dramatically, forming a cephalothorax from the thorax and head. Respiratory openings in the cephalothorax again facilitate breathing at the water surface, but no feeding occurs.

=== Adult ===
After several days, the cephalothorax backside ruptures and the adult arises. The adult A. freeborni gathers its strength on the water surface until it is able to fly away in search of a bloodmeal.

== Food resources ==
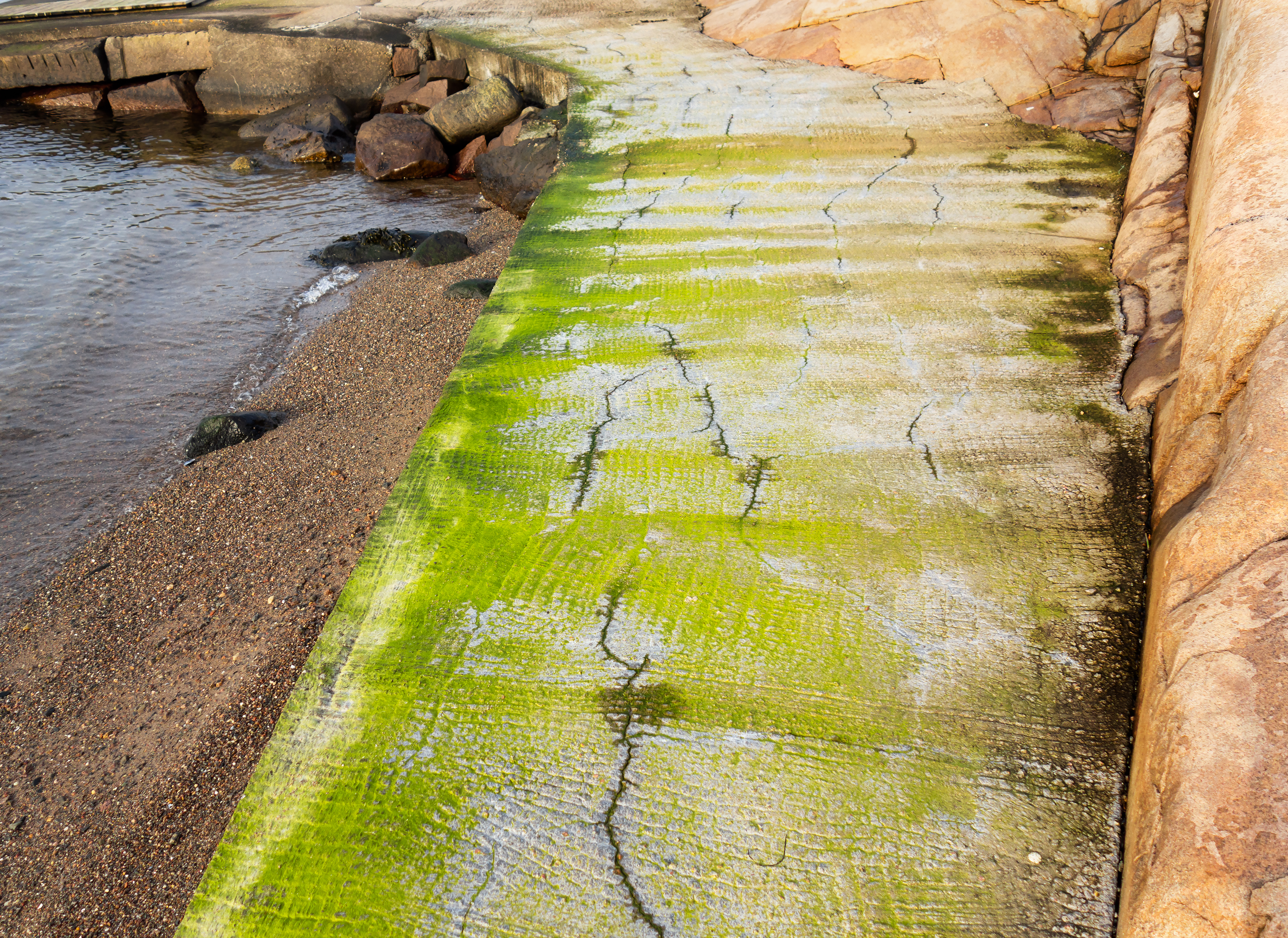
Algae is a common food source for A. freeborni

Larvae feed on microorganisms on top of the water, such as algae. Feeding is facilitated by oral brushes, which generate spiraling currents that direct microorganisms into the mouths of larval A. freeborni.

The adult western malaria mosquito relies on bloodmeals for food. It has been suggested as an "opportunistic feeder", with food choice influenced by available hosts. They commonly feed on humans and sizable domesticated animals, like cattle, horses, and dogs. Deer and sheep are also notable hosts. A. freeborni have also been observed frequently feeding on rabbits. Studies have not indicated a general preference for human or animal hosts, although host selection may vary with availability, human activity, and housing quality. Feeding occurs primarily during and after dusk, although daytime attacks may occur in when the weather is overcast. Females are also known to facilitate human bloodmeals by entering their homes.

== Mating ==
Mating of A. freeborni occurs following the aggregation of individuals into swarms. It typically occurs on evenings during the late summer season, from about July through September. Swarms of males assemble minutes after sunset, with more individuals joining throughout the first 15 minutes, after which there is a gradual decrease. Swarming is initiated at light intensities of about 350 lux and ended at about 0.5 lux. Circadian rhythms also play a major role, as swarming does not occur during the day. These swarms can reach numbers of 500 to 3000 mosquitoes and last as long as 35 minutes. Smaller-sized males will initiate a swarm to increase their chances of mating by decreasing competition, but also experience prolonged vulnerability to predators. Smaller-sized males mate with significantly less frequency than larger-sized males. Females join the swarm during its highest density, and copulation activity occurs from about 10 to 20 minutes after swarm formation.

== Parental care ==
The gonotrophic cycle indicates the time spent seeking out a host, feeding on a bloodmeal, egg development, and oviposition. For A. freeborni, this cycle varies from 4 to 6 days, depending on consumption status. Unfed females have a longer gonotrophic cycle due to the mating and maturation period required by newly molted females. Sites selected for oviposition are synonymous with favored larval habitats. Female oviposition favors shallow, still bodies of water, which are at least partially sunlit during the day and which preferably contain some algae or other vegetative matter. Larvae are infrequently developed in bodies of water covered in shadow.

== Predators ==
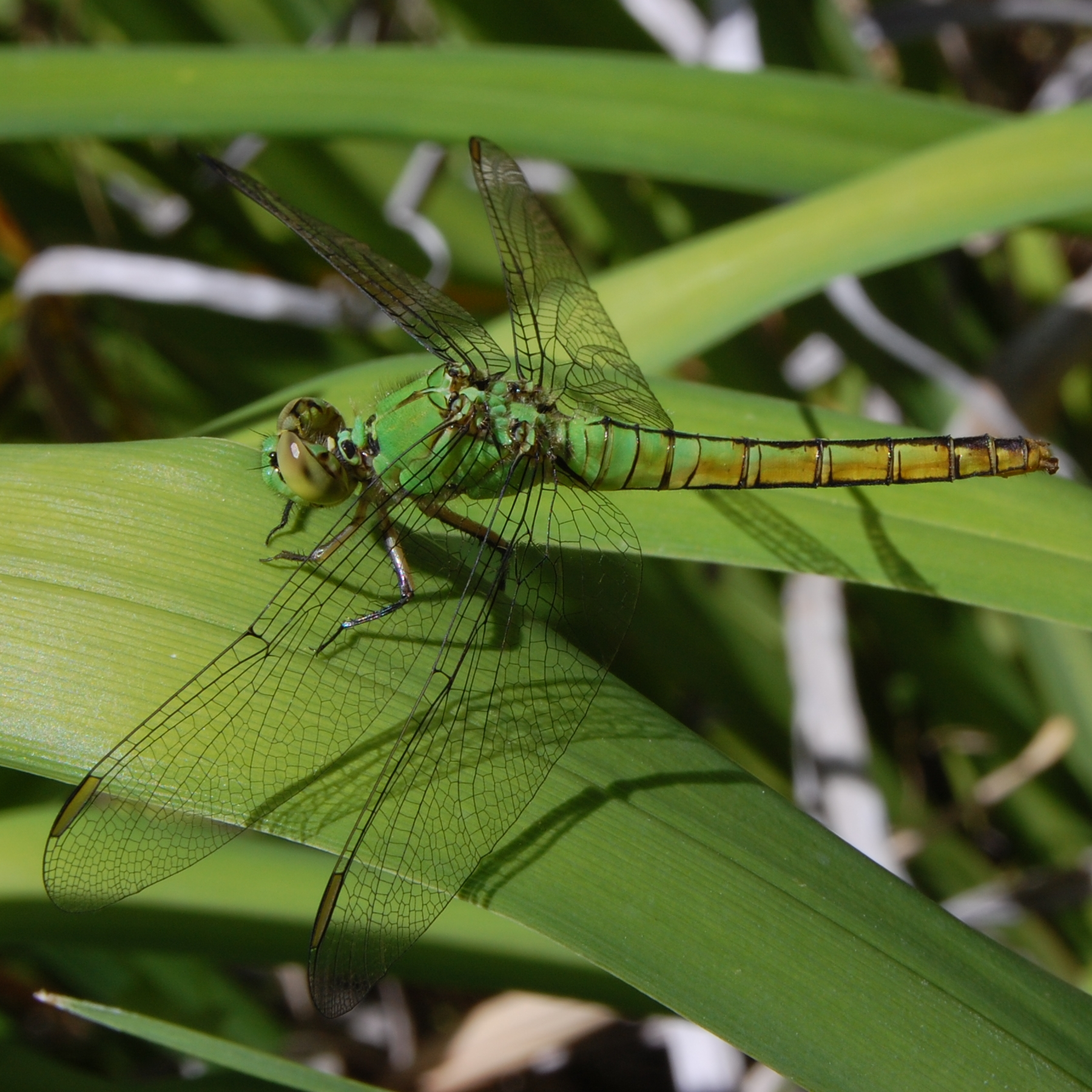
Erythemis collocata, a common predator

Known predators include Erythemis collocata and Pantala hymenaea, species belonging to the Libellulidae family of dragonflies. Predation partially overlaps with mating activity, as western malaria mosquitoes are most frequently attacked during swarming. Predatory activity begins with swarm initiation and remains intense for the next 15 minutes. Dragonfly predation is reliant on visual detection, so attacks decrease as it gets darker. Attacks occur more frequently over open areas, reflecting dragonfly foraging preferences. Larval dragonflies may also prey upon the mosquito larvae, along with other predators such as frogs, spiders, and flatworms; these larval predators may be used to control the population of Anopheles mosquitos in order to decrease malarial transmission.

== Interactions with humans ==
Historically, A. freeborni has been considered the primary transmission vector for malaria in the western regions of the United States. It was primarily involved in the malaria outbreaks of northern California in the late 19th century and early 20th century. However, the frequency of human bloodmeals and the mosquito's potential as a transmission vector may be limited by human behavior and relative accessibility in certain areas. Recent studies have also questioned the significance of A. freeborni as a transmission vector due to their morphological similarity with A. hermsi, whose presence has recently been identified throughout Colorado and Arizona.

=== Control ===
Insecticides have commonly been used for mosquito control in the past. Such pesticidal agents as Bacillus thuringiensis, as well as some piperidine compounds and CIC-4, a lactone, are known to be effective at controlling A. freeborni larvae. In an effort to combat insecticide dependence, recent studies have investigated mosquitofish (G. affinis), a predator of the mosquito larvae, as a means of control. Their presence has been found to significantly reduce A. freeborni larval densities in rice fields.
