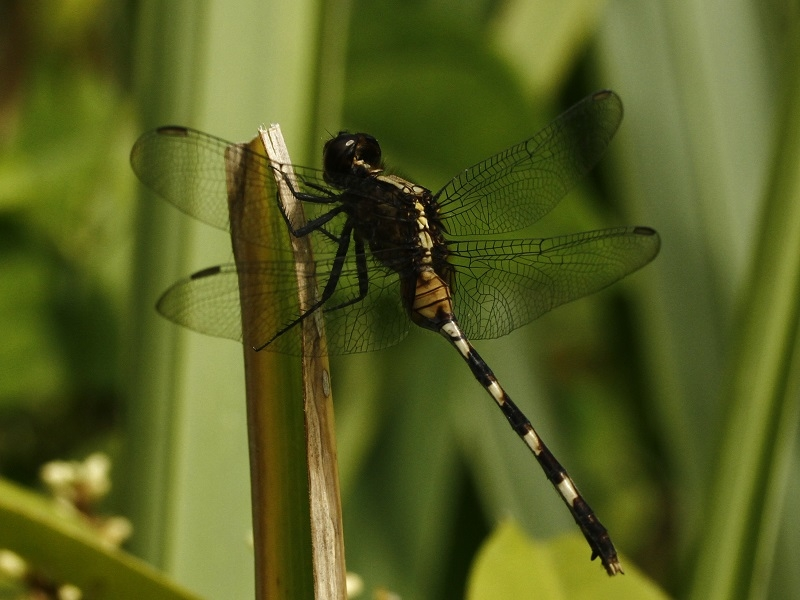

Conservation status
- Least Concern (IUCN 3.1)

Scientific classification
- Kingdom: Animalia
- Phylum: Arthropoda
- Class: Insecta
- Order: Odonata
- Infraorder: Anisoptera
- Family: Libellulidae
- Genus: Erythemis
- Species: E. plebeja

Binomial name
- Erythemis plebeja (Burmeister, 1839)

= Erythemis plebeja =

Species of dragonfly

Erythemis plebeja, the pin-tailed pondhawk, is a species of skimmer in the dragonfly family Libellulidae. It is found in the Caribbean Sea, Central America, North America, and South America.

The IUCN conservation status of Erythemis plebeja is "LC", least concern, with no immediate threat to the species' survival. The population is increasing. The IUCN status was reviewed in 2017.

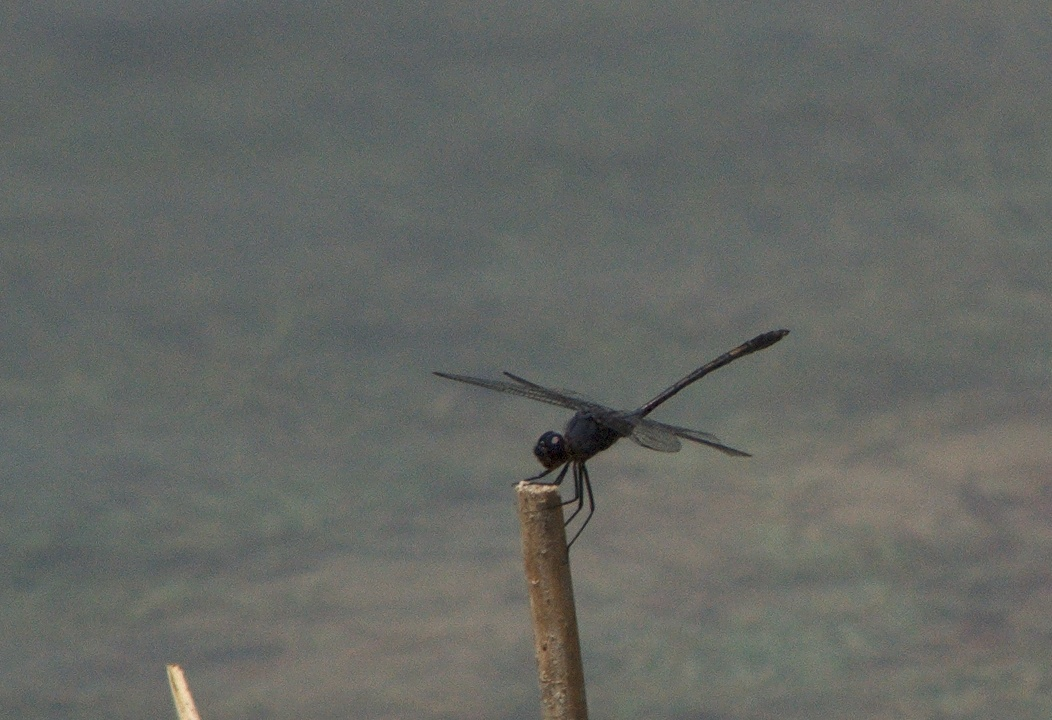
Pin-tailed pondhawk, Erythemis plebeja

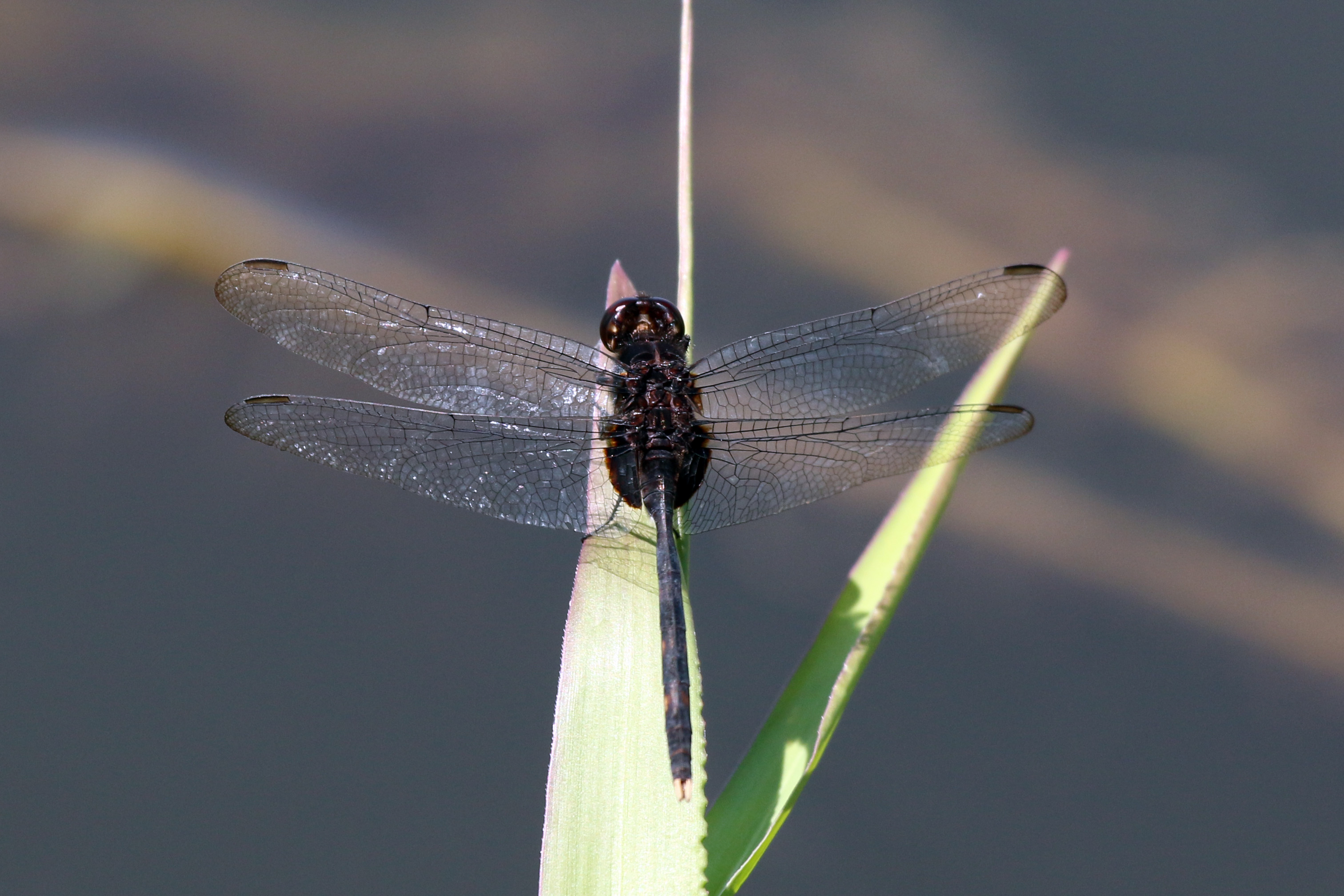
Pin-tailed pondhawk, Erythemis plebeja
