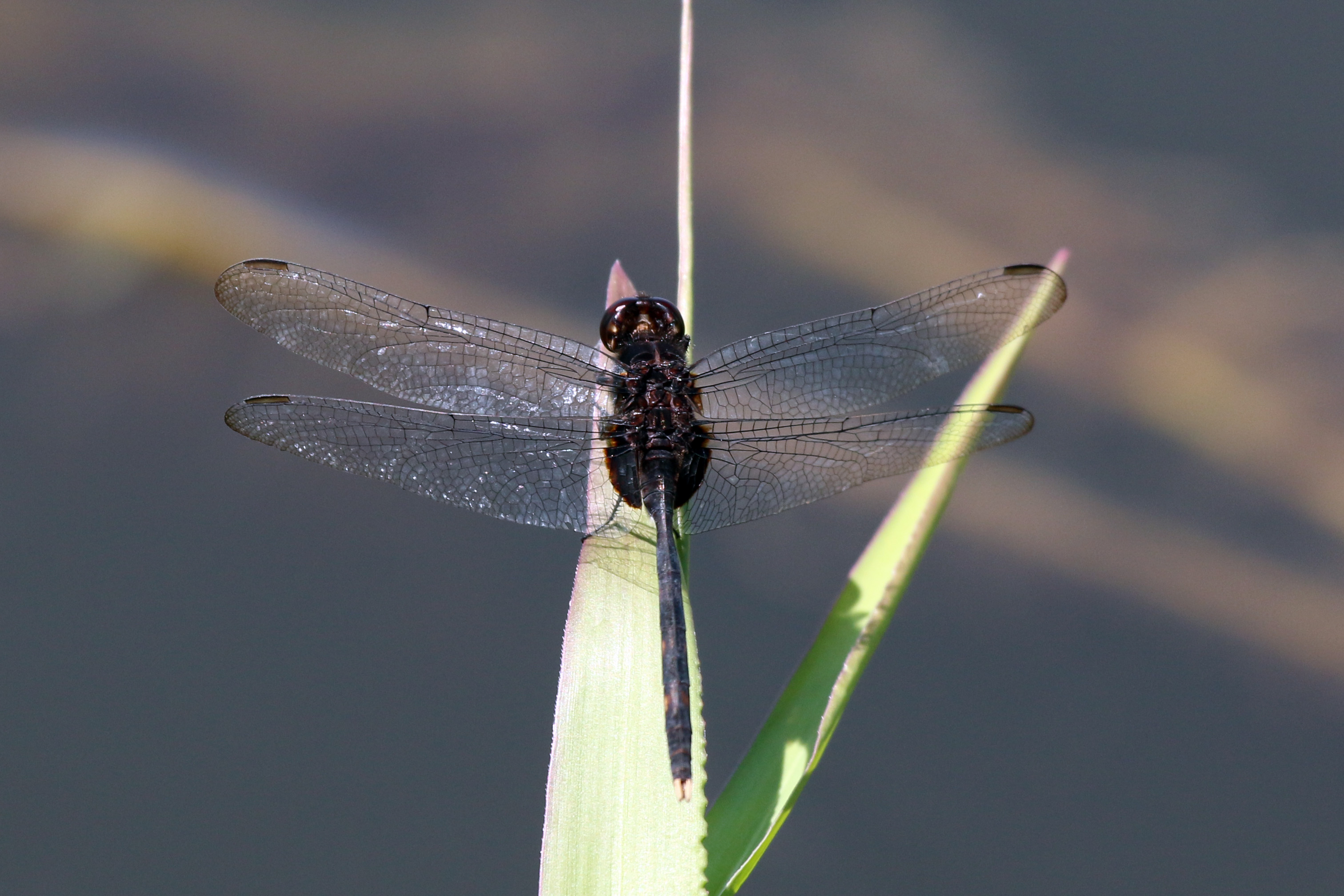
- E. plebeja, Tobago

Scientific classification
- Kingdom: Animalia
- Phylum: Arthropoda
- Class: Insecta
- Order: Odonata
- Infraorder: Anisoptera
- Family: Libellulidae
- Subfamily: Sympetrinae
- Genus: Erythemis; Hagen, 1861

= Erythemis =

Pondhawks

Genus of dragonflies

Erythemis is a genus of dragonflies in the Libellulidae family, commonly known as pondhawks. These medium- to large-sized skimmers are voracious predators of other insects up to their own size, including other dragonflies.

The genus contains the following species:

Species	Common name	Male	Female
E. attala (Selys in Sagra, 1857)	black pondhawk		
E. carmelita Williamson, 1923			
E. collocata (Hagen, 1861)	western pondhawk		
E. credula (Hagen, 1861)			
E. haematogastra (Burmeister, 1839)	red pondhawk		
E. mithroides (Brauer, 1900)	claret pondhawk		
E. peruviana (Rambur, 1842)	flame-tailed pondhawk		
E. plebeja (Burmeister, 1839)	pin-tailed pondhawk		
E. simplicicollis (Say, 1840)	eastern pondhawk		
E. vesiculosa (Fabricius, 1775)	great pondhawk		
