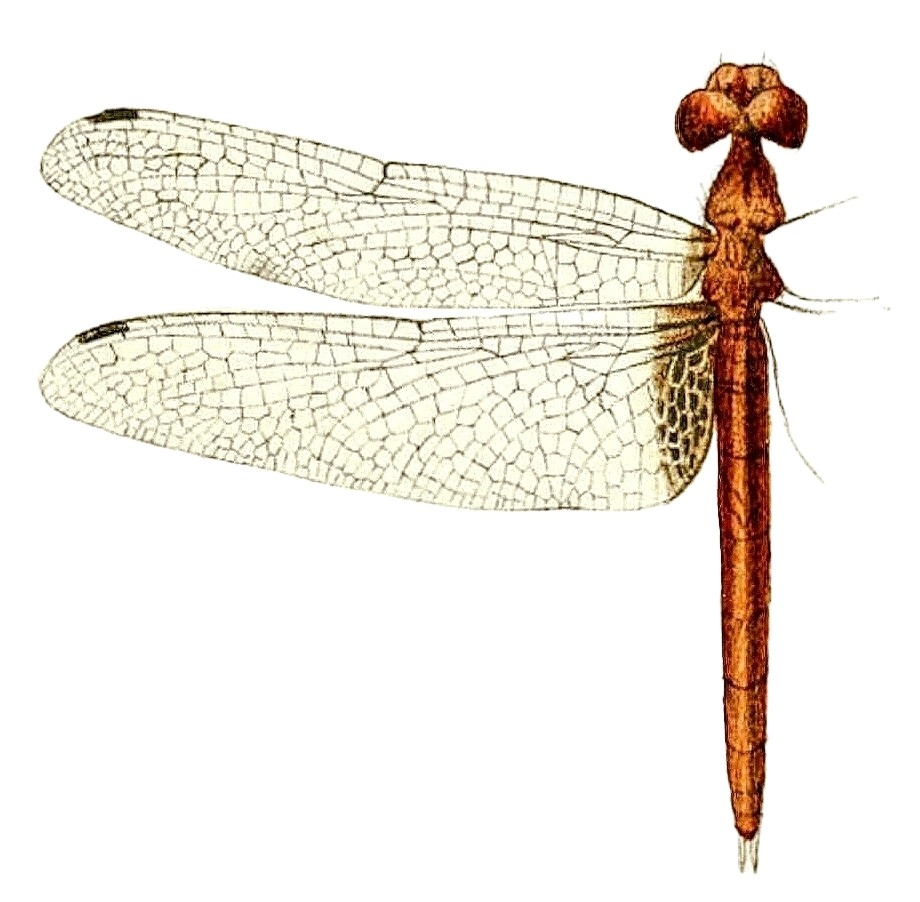
- Claret pondhawk (Erythemis mithroides)

Conservation status
- Least Concern (IUCN 3.1)

Scientific classification
- Kingdom: Animalia
- Phylum: Arthropoda
- Class: Insecta
- Order: Odonata
- Infraorder: Anisoptera
- Family: Libellulidae
- Genus: Erythemis
- Species: E. mithroides

Binomial name
- Erythemis mithroides (Brauer, 1900)

Synonyms
- Mesothemis mithroides (Brauer, 1900) Basionym

= Erythemis mithroides =

Species of dragonfly

Erythemis mithroides, the claret pondhawk, is a neotropical dragonfly belonging to the suborder Anisoptera, family Libellulidae. Dragonflies play an important ecological role: they are efficient predators of a huge variety of insects, consumed in large quantities, both in the adult and larval stages; they are prey for larger animals, feeding birds, fish, reptiles, amphibians and other arthropods; and are important bioindicators for assessing freshwater quality and monitoring the conservation of wetlands.

== Description ==
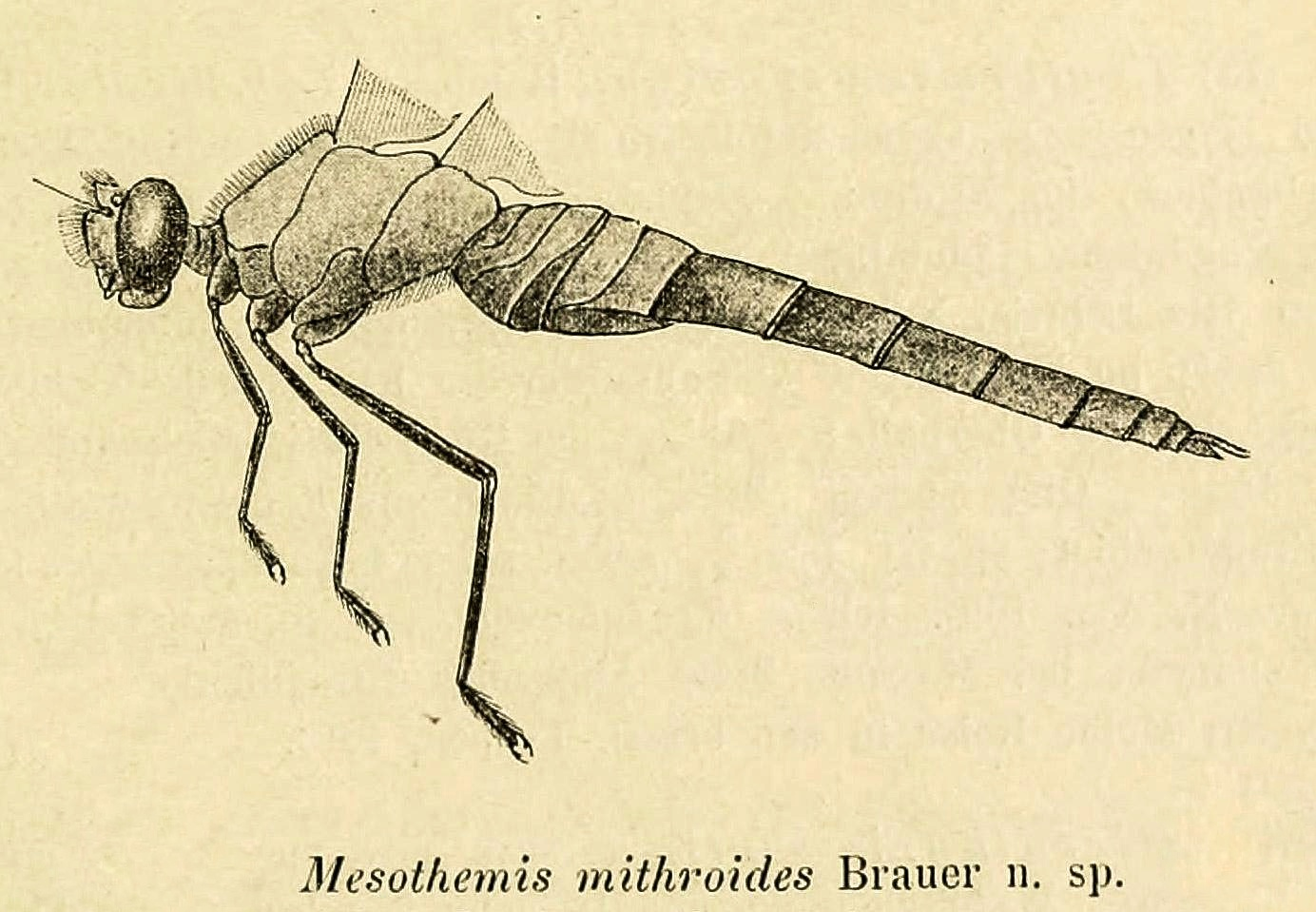

Male – yellow or brown lip with or without a dark longitudinal stripe in the middle region. Red front and apex. Thorax red or brown with red reflections, without light stripes on the dorsal region. Femur brown or with brown anterior region and black posterior region. Tibia brown, brown and black or completely black. Abdomen completely red. Red abdominal appendages. Wings with brown basal spot and inflamed or hyaline apices.
Female – yellow lip with green reflections and a longitudinal black stripe in the central region. Front black, green or yellow, apex brown. Chest brown with green reflections. Completely black tibia and femur. Abdomen red with yellow or brown reflections. Red abdominal appendages. Wings with brown basal spot and inflamed apex. Yellow pterostigma with brown costal border.
Larva – small, ochreous in color, with a head that is wider than long. The occipital margin is straight and surrounded by setae; the antennas have seven segments; the eyes are compound, globular and are in an anterolateral position and projected forward; the incisors and molars of the jaw are obtuse; mandibular formula L/R 1234/(123+4) y/xy abb'/abd ; the lip is wide and has small dark spots; The prementum has 13 setae and the lateral margin has 11 large, spiniform setae on each side. The labial palp is long, with small dark spots and eight arrows on each side. Movable claw with a length approximately equal to that of the adjacent arrow; External margin of the palp with 13 small spiniform setae that extend to the fifth bristle of the palp, internal margin gently crenulated with 24 large spiniform setae that alternate with groups of two to nine small setae. Thorax with rounded prothoracic supracoxal processes, surrounded by spines of variable size; dorsal surface of the prothorax covered by a row of small setae, posterior margin with two rows of short setae on the suture between the prothorax and synthorax, the latter with two curved rows of small setae anterior to the spiracle. The wing thecae reach the sixth abdominal segment and have scattered setae on their upper edge. The legs have spiniform setae of variable size; The femur of the second pair of legs has a dark brown circular band at the end. The third pair of legs is much larger than the previous two. The abdomen is short, cylindrical and has the distal end facing upwards. The caudal appendages have a large number of setae. The epiproct is triangular in shape, lanceolate in dorsal view; The cerci are conical and divergent, exceeding half the length of the epiproct. The paraprocts are pyramidal and strongly divergent.
Note: As with other odonate taxa, Erythemis is not a monophyletic group due to the extensive homoplasy and structural variability observed in its diagnostic characters. In addition to the high intra- and interspecific variation that most characters exhibit in the genus, a large number of character states are shared with other genera as well.

== Distribution ==
The claret pondhawk is a dragonfly with a wide geographic distribution that occurs in southeast Texas and Mexico, North America, Central America, including the Antilles, and South America, except Chile. In Brazil, it occurs in all biomes and river basins.

== Ecology ==
Erythemis mithroides is an active, brightly colored dragonfly associated with natural and artificial lentic environments —swamps, marshes, mangroves, river backwaters, lakes, fish ponds, reservoirs, and dams — surrounded by secondary vegetation, degraded riparian forests, agricultural crops, grasses or shrubs, and various anthropogenic areas. The species can be seen, usually in considerable numbers, perched on grass stems and branches at or near the water's edge, or flying, generally lower than other species, such as E. haematogastra and E. plebeja, which are larger than it. Adult males are territorial, perching and flying alternately, continually displaying signs of heterospecific aggression during mate-finding and food-hunting activities.
