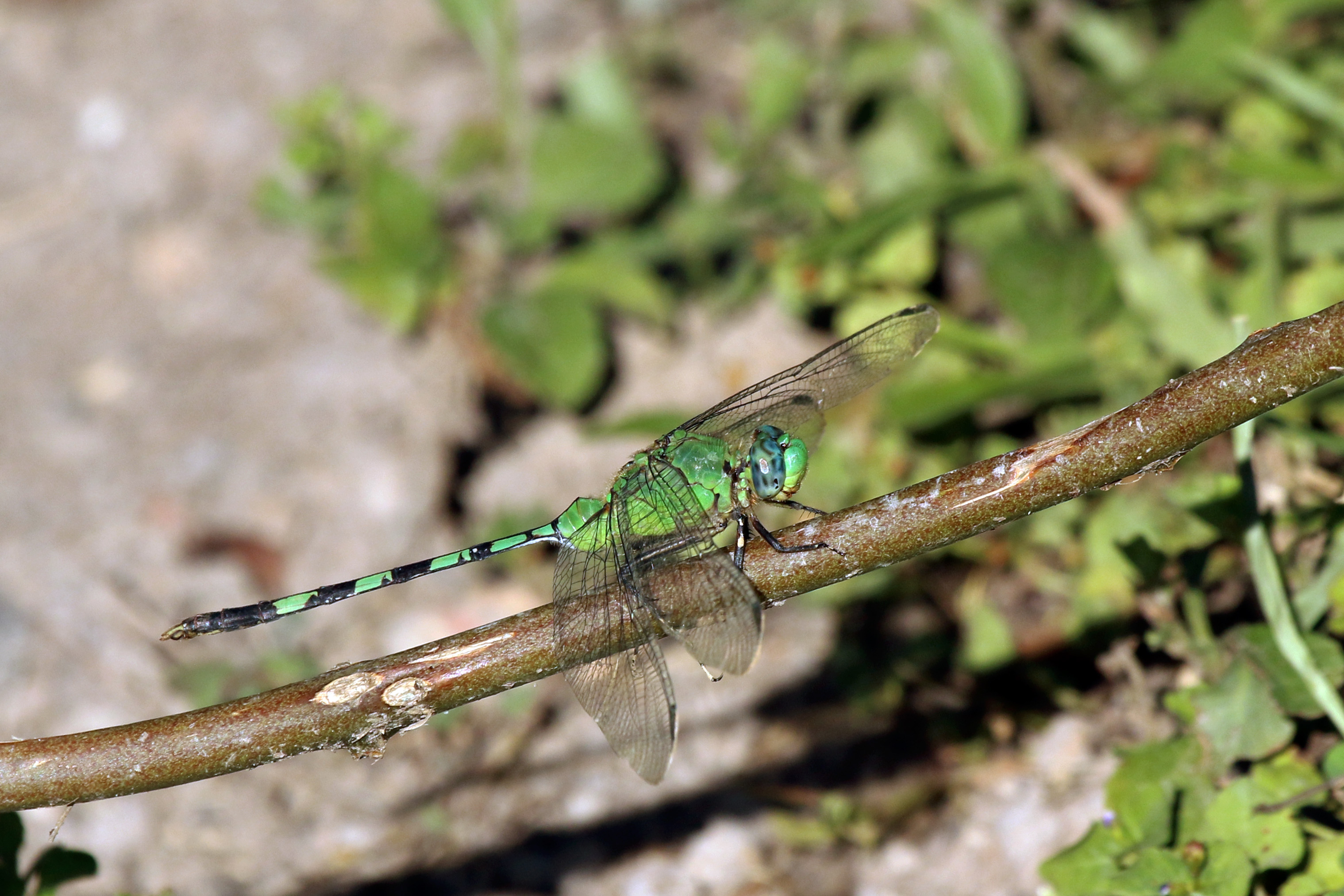
- Male, Trinidad

Conservation status
- Least Concern (IUCN 3.1)

Scientific classification
- Kingdom: Animalia
- Phylum: Arthropoda
- Clade: Pancrustacea
- Class: Insecta
- Order: Odonata
- Infraorder: Anisoptera
- Superfamily: Libelluloidea
- Family: Libellulidae
- Genus: Erythemis
- Species: E. vesiculosa

Binomial name
- Erythemis vesiculosa (Fabricius, 1775)

= Erythemis vesiculosa =

Species of dragonfly

Erythemis vesiculosa, the great pondhawk, is a dragonfly of the family Libellulidae. It is distributed throughout the Americas as far north as the United States.

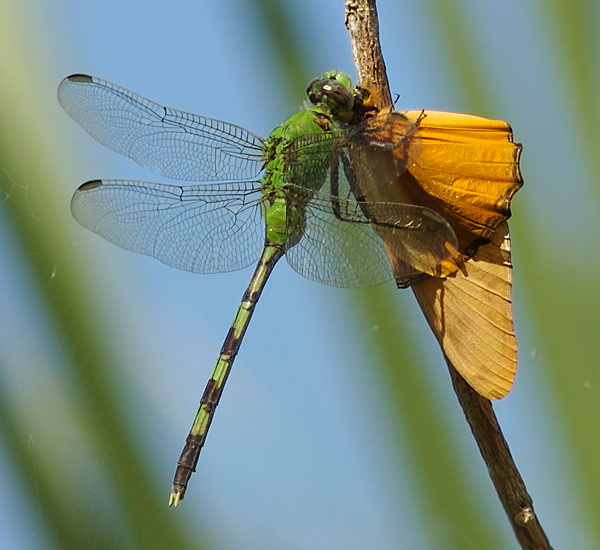
male eating Julia butterfly Dryas iulia

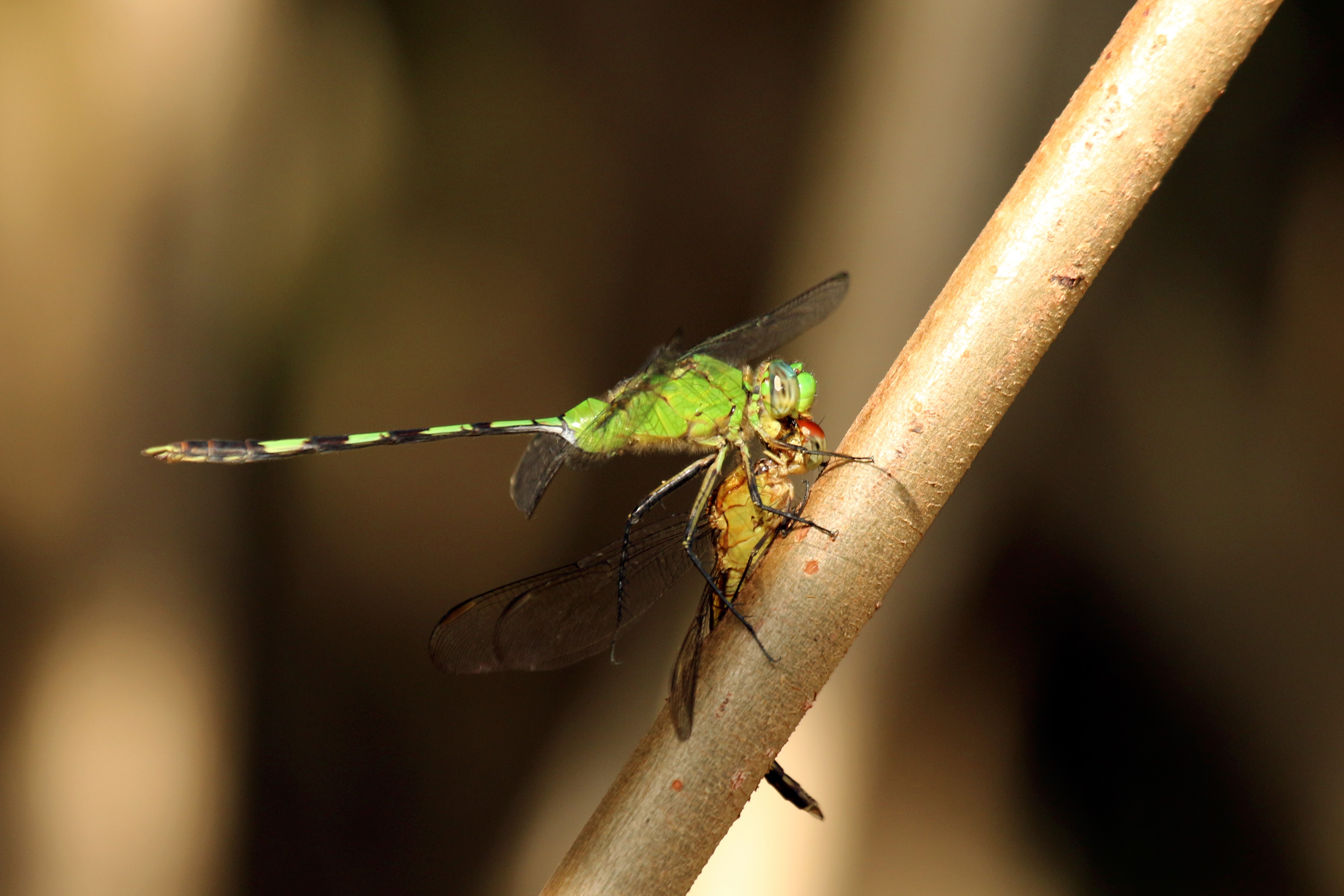
male eating band-winged dragonlet Erythrodiplax umbrata, Trinidad

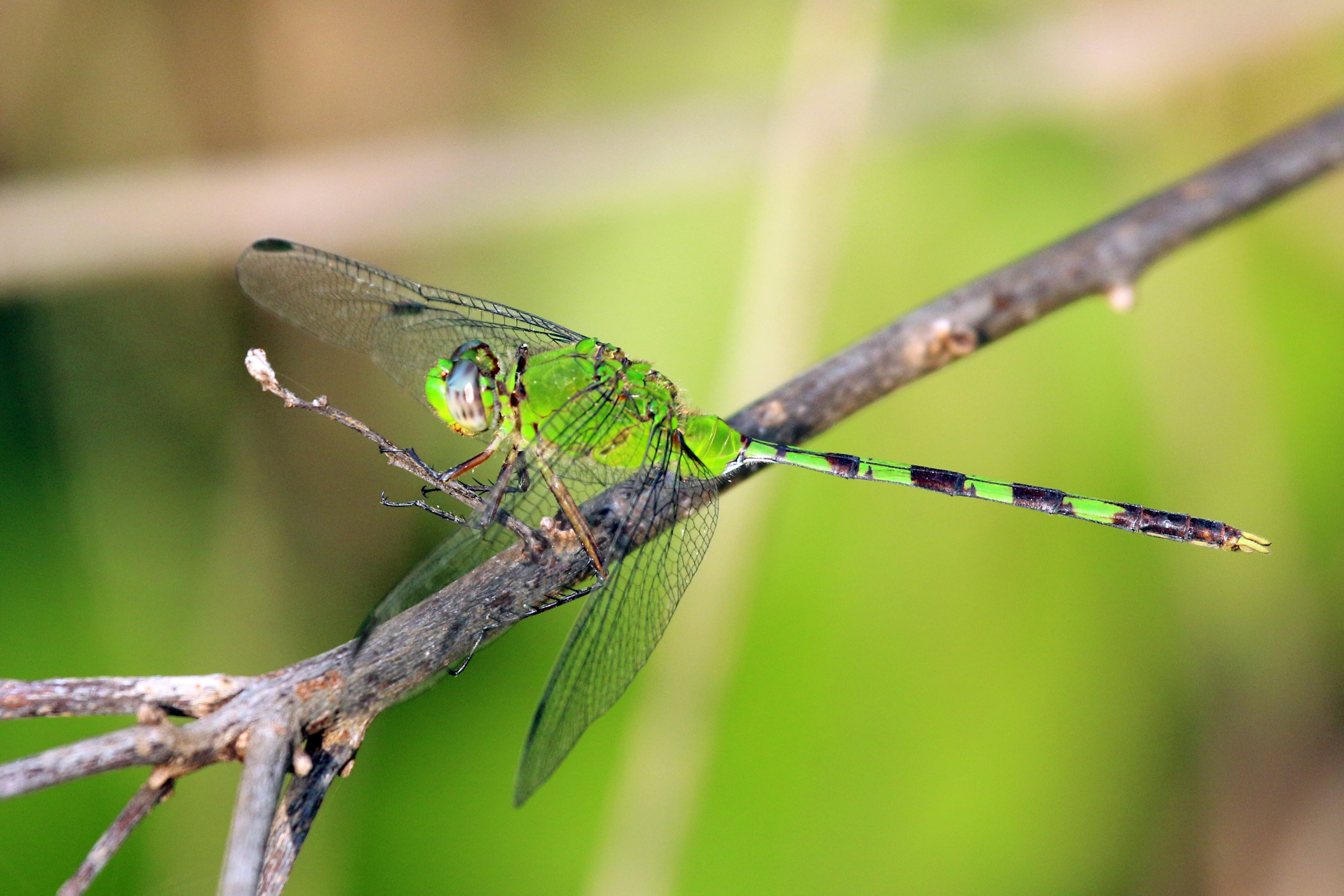
male, Jamaica
