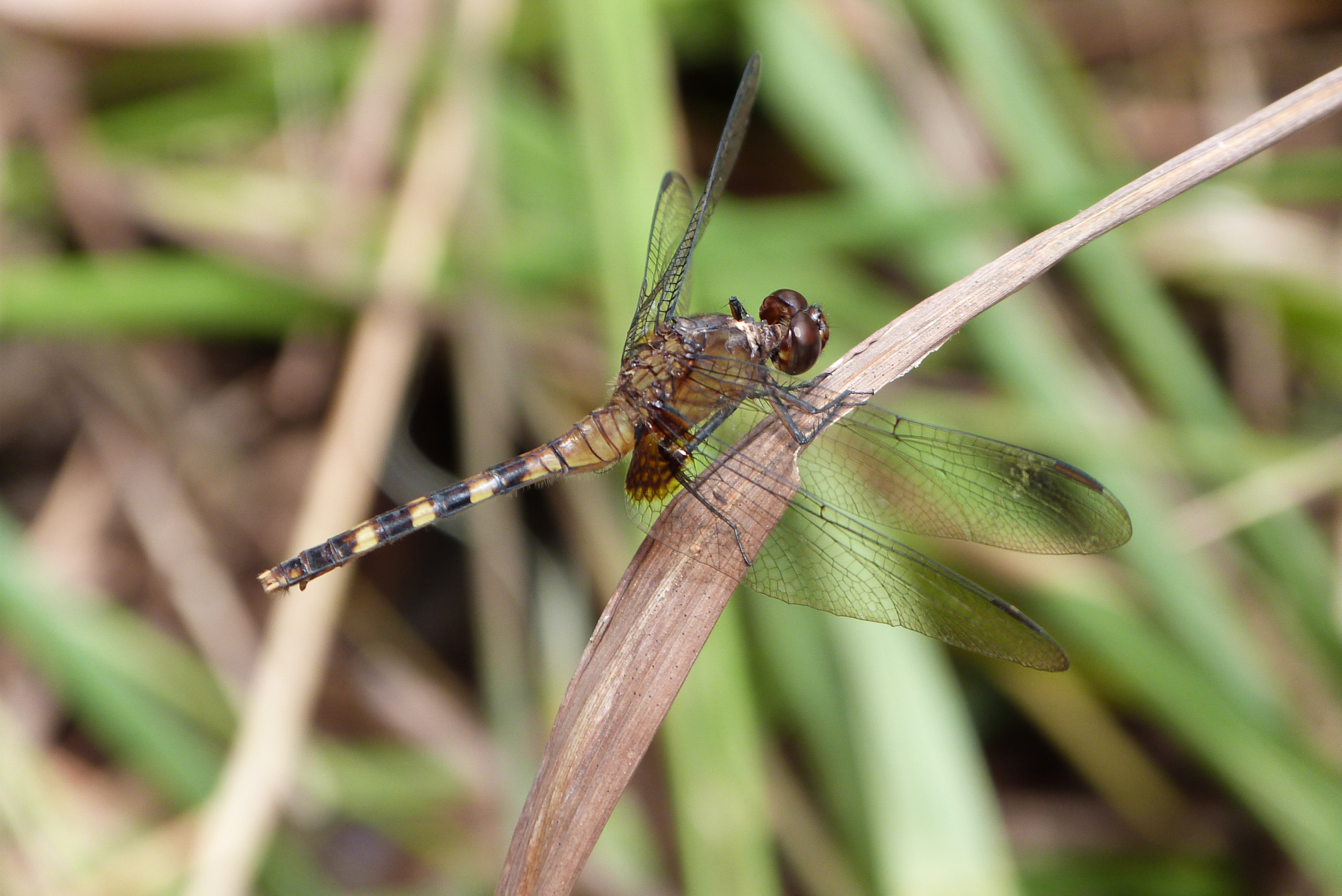

Conservation status
- Least Concern (IUCN 3.1)

Scientific classification
- Kingdom: Animalia
- Phylum: Arthropoda
- Class: Insecta
- Order: Odonata
- Infraorder: Anisoptera
- Family: Libellulidae
- Genus: Erythemis
- Species: E. attala

Binomial name
- Erythemis attala (Selys in Sagra, 1857)

= Erythemis attala =

Species of dragonfly

Erythemis attala, the black pondhawk, is a species of skimmer in the dragonfly family Libellulidae. It is found in the Caribbean Sea, Central America, North America, and South America.

The IUCN conservation status of Erythemis attala is "LC", least concern, with no immediate threat to the species' survival. The population is stable. The IUCN status was reviewed in 2017.
