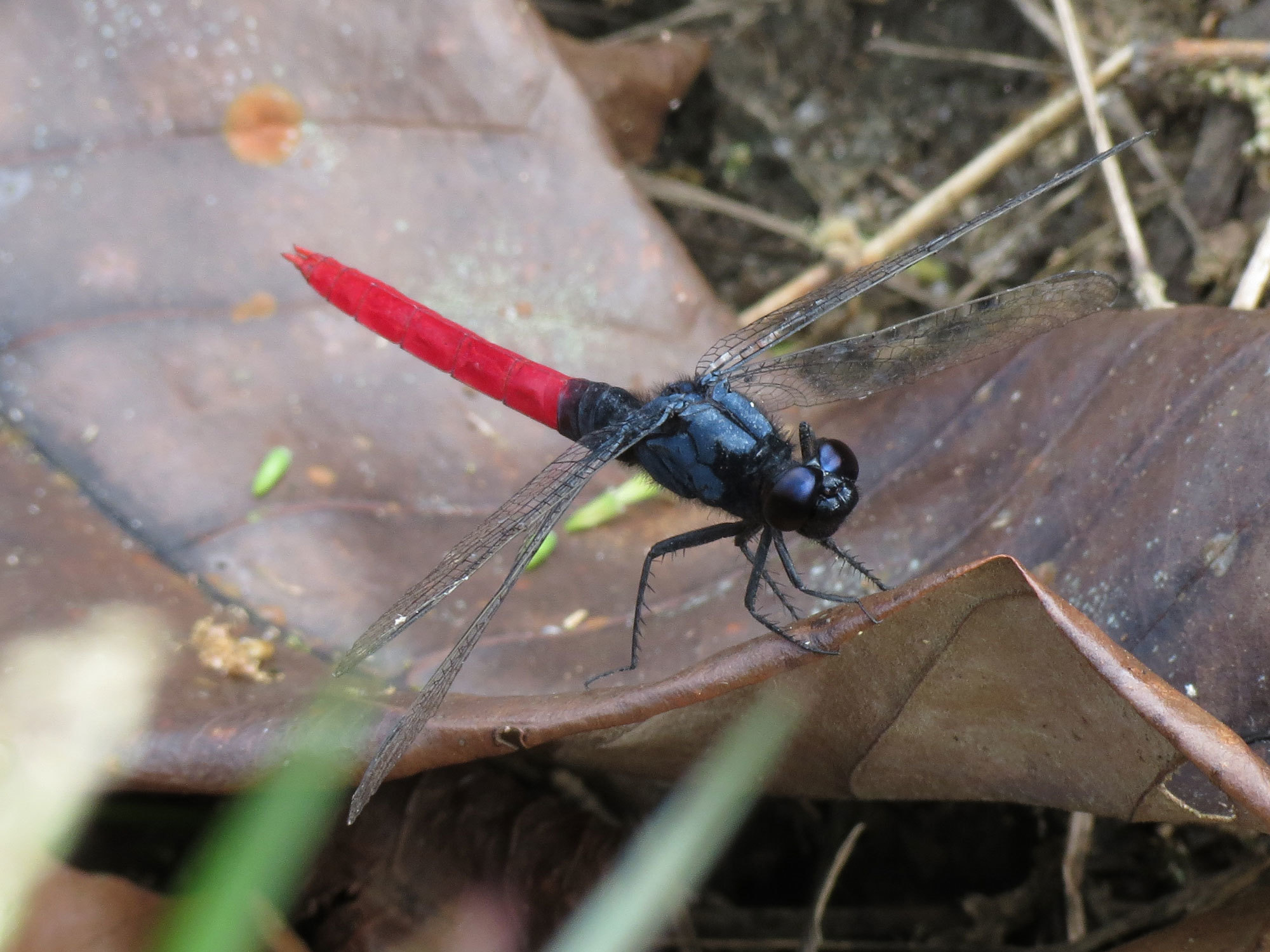
- Male
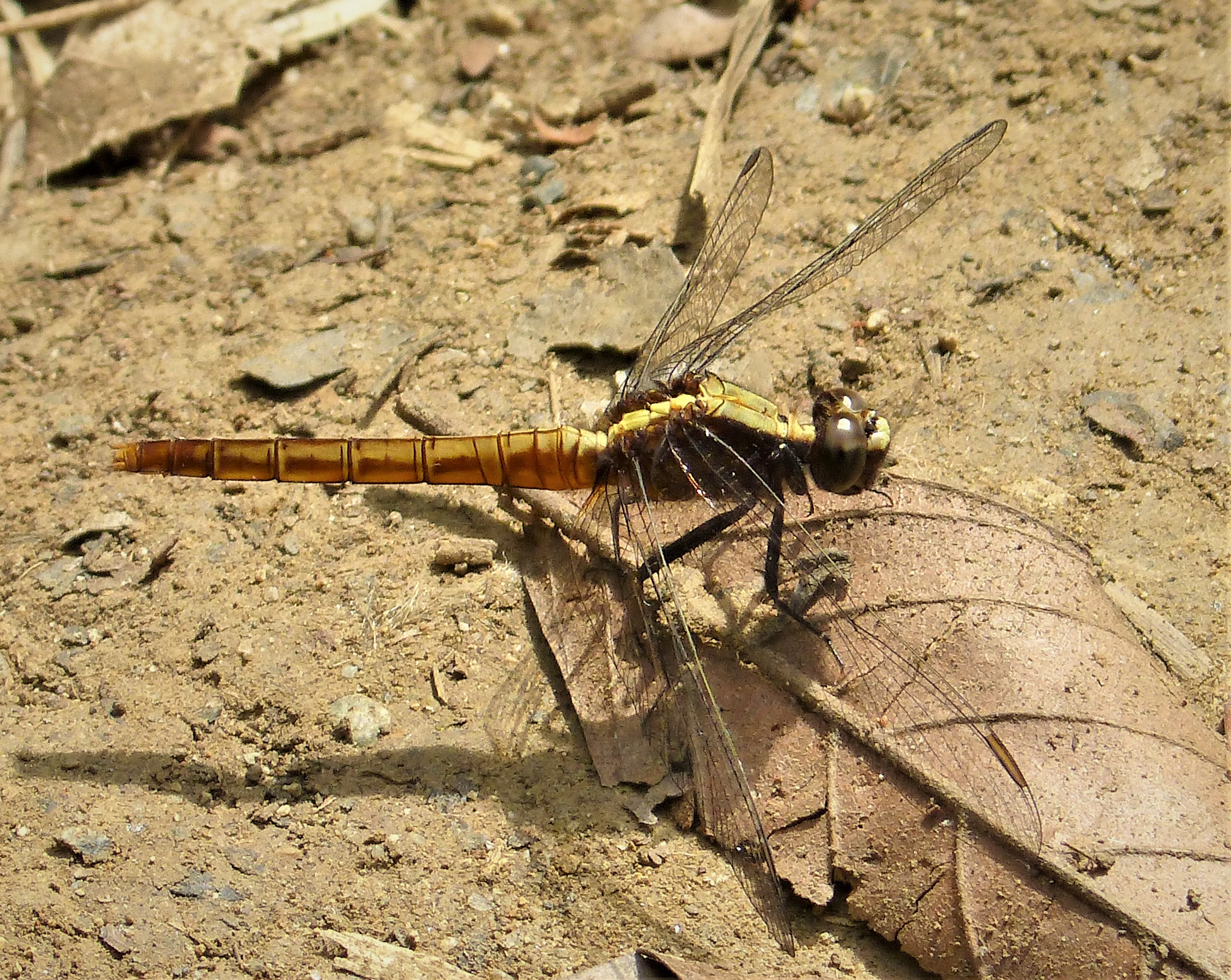
- Female

Scientific classification
- Kingdom: Animalia
- Phylum: Arthropoda
- Class: Insecta
- Order: Odonata
- Infraorder: Anisoptera
- Family: Libellulidae
- Genus: Erythemis
- Species: E. peruviana

Binomial name
- Erythemis peruviana (Rambur, 1842)

= Erythemis peruviana =

Species of insect

Erythemis peruviana, also known by its common name flame-tailed pondhawk, is a species from the genus Erythemis. This species was first described and named by Jules Pierre Rambur.

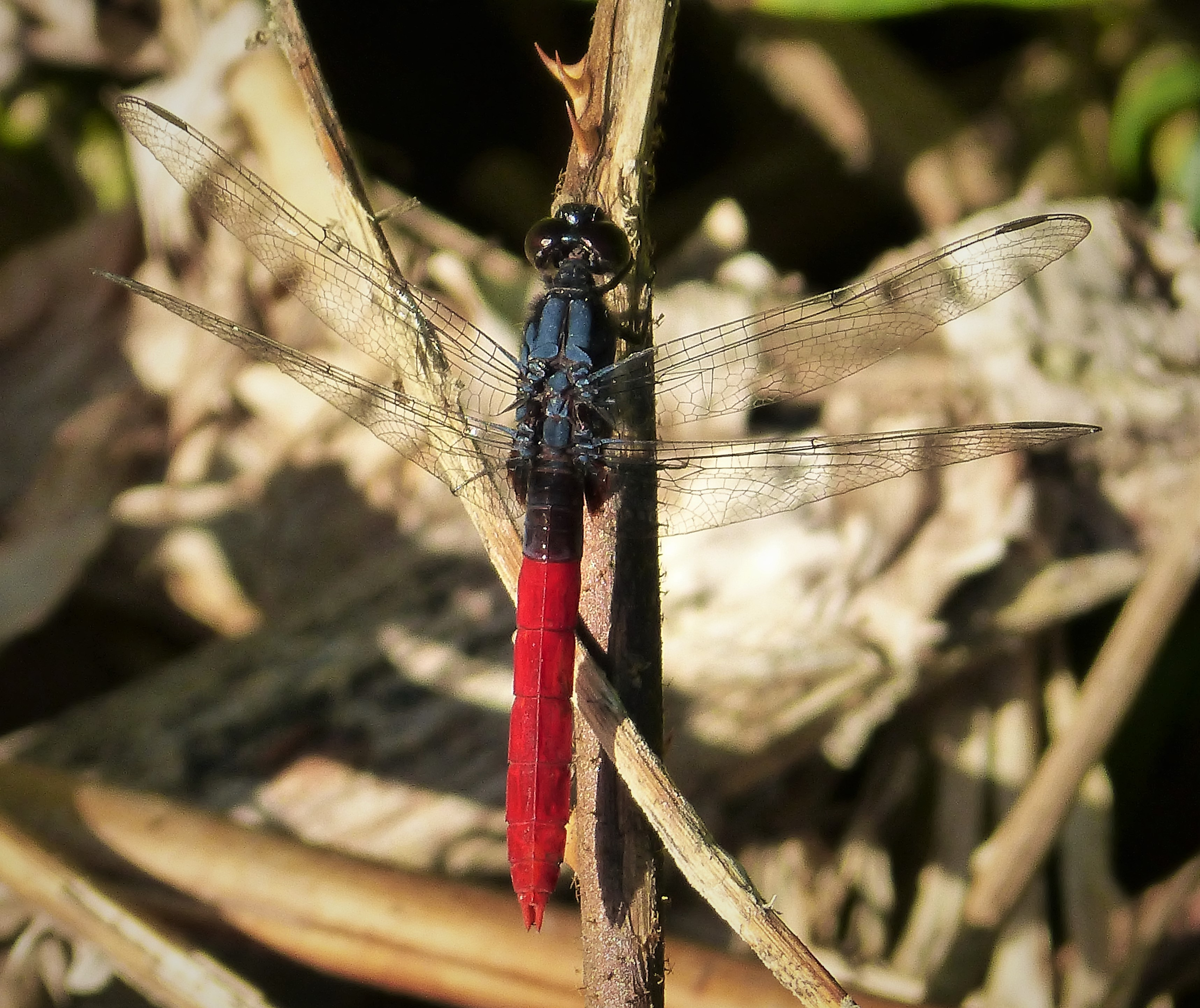
Male, Gamboa, Panama
