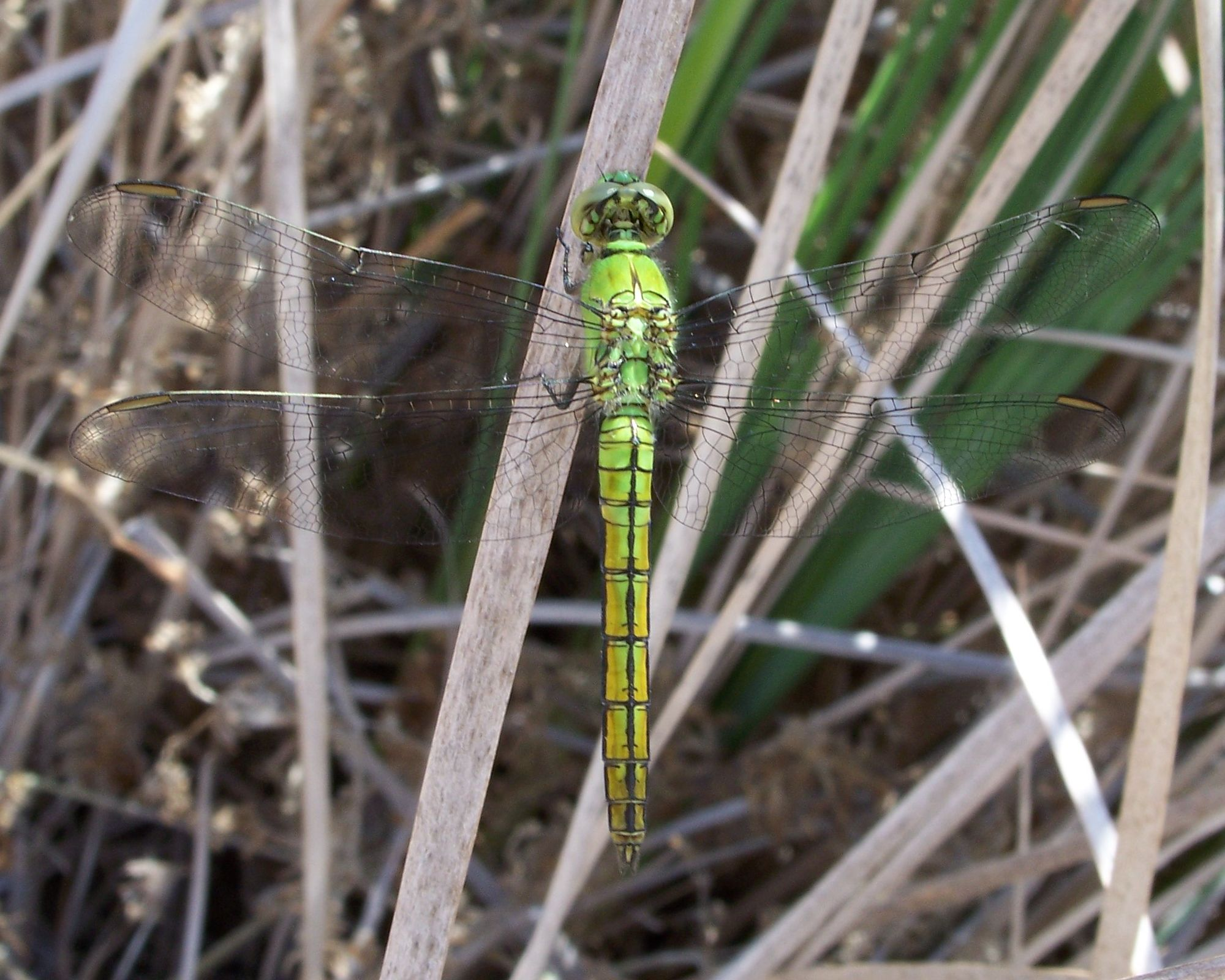

Scientific classification
- Domain: Eukaryota
- Kingdom: Animalia
- Phylum: Arthropoda
- Class: Insecta
- Order: Odonata
- Infraorder: Anisoptera
- Family: Libellulidae
- Genus: Erythemis
- Species: E. collocata

Binomial name
- Erythemis collocata (Hagen, 1861)

= Erythemis collocata =

Western pondhawk

Species of dragonfly

Erythemis collocata, the western pondhawk, is a dragonfly of the family Libellulidae, native to western Canada, the western United States, and Mexico.

== Food Resources ==
Erythemis collocata is known to feed on the western malaria mosquito, Anopheles freeborni. This predation primarily occurs at dusk, when A. freeborni aggregate into swarms in order to mate. Due to the reliance of E. collocata on visual stimuli to attack its prey, the frequency of attacks decreases as the sky gets darker.
