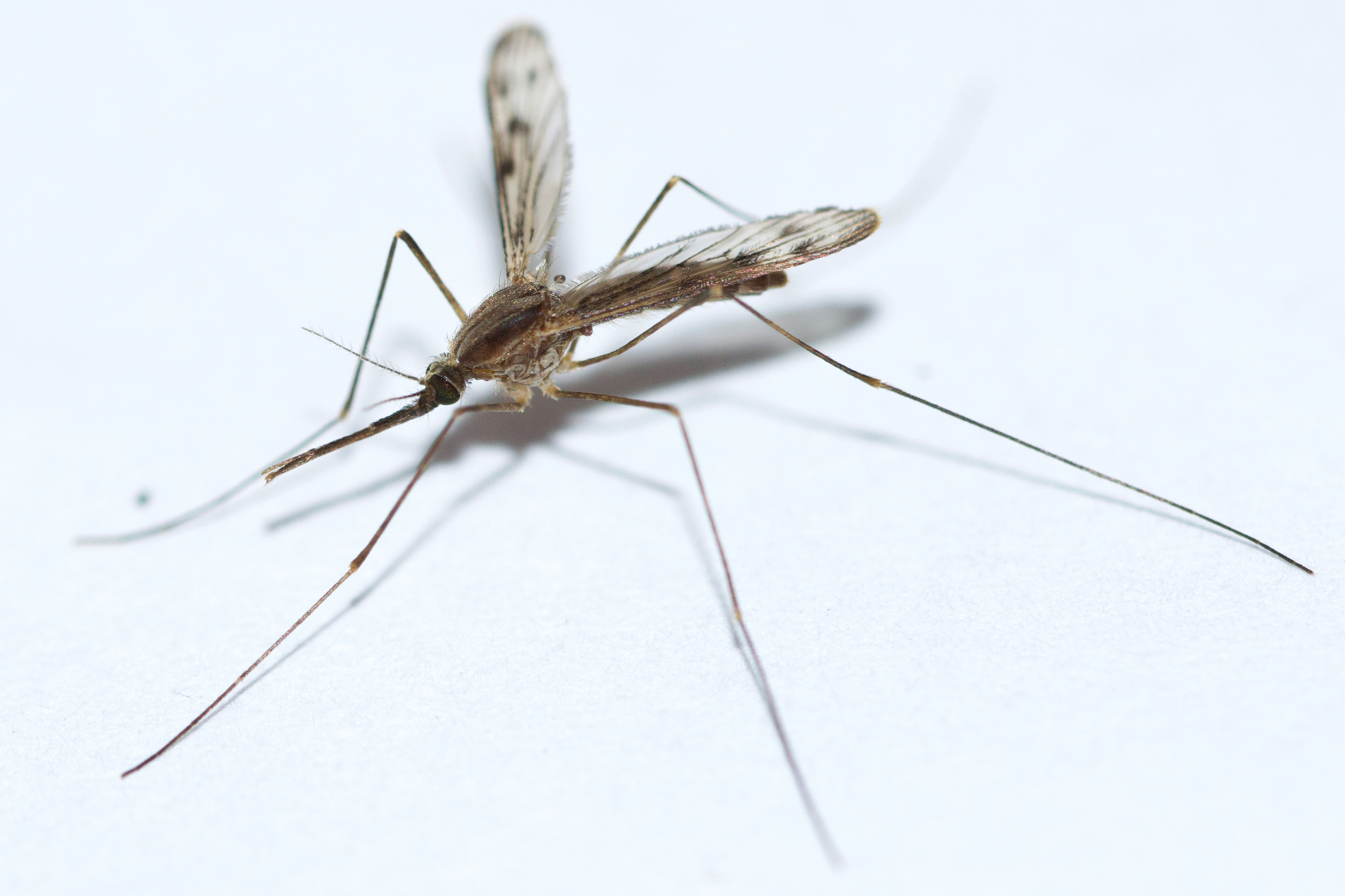

Scientific classification
- Kingdom: Animalia
- Phylum: Arthropoda
- Class: Insecta
- Order: Diptera
- Family: Culicidae
- Genus: Anopheles
- Subgenus: Anopheles
- Species: A. earlei

Binomial name
- Anopheles earlei Vargas, 1943

= Anopheles earlei =

Species of mosquito

Anopheles earlei is a small mosquito found throughout North America. The Anopheles earlei larvae are found in cold, clear water in ponds and other small bodies of water that contain plant life or vegetation.
