= Bironella =

Scientific classification
- Kingdom: Animalia
- Phylum: Arthropoda
- Class: Insecta
- Order: Diptera
- Family: Culicidae
- Subfamily: Anophelinae
- Genus: Bironella; Theobald, 1905

Type species
- Bironella gracilis Theobald, 1905

Species
- See text

Genus of mosquitoes

Bironella is one of the three mosquito genera in the subfamily Anophelinae. Its species are found around New Guinea, from the Maluku Islands east to New Britain and south to northern Australia. The other two genera in the subfamily are Anopheles, which has a nearly worldwide distribution, and Chagasia, which is found in the Neotropics.

== Description ==
Members of the genus Bironella resemble those of the genus Anopheles. They are described as "delicate insects" varying in colour from light to dark brown. Adults can be separated from Anopheles by the pattern of veins on their wings. Larvae are distinguished by the organization of hairs (chaetae) on their thorax.

== Distribution and habitat ==
Bironella is mainly found in the Papuan Subregion of Malesia, centred on New Guinea, although two species are also found in northern Australia. Bironella gracilis is the most widely distributed species, found from Ceram in the west to New Britain in the east. Larvae and pupae are usually found in habitats such as the margins of pools, slow-flowing streams and swamps. Adults have rarely been collected or seen in the wild, but may be captured in Malaise traps in undisturbed forest.

== Species ==
The genus Bironella comprises eight described species, which may be divided into three subgenera:

- Subgenus Bironella Theobald, 1905
  - Bironella gracilis Theobald, 1905
  - Bironella simmondsi Tenorio, 1977
- Subgenus Brugella Edwards, 1930
  - Bironella hollandi Taylor, 1934
  - Bironella obscura Tenorio, 1975
  - Bironella travestita (Brug, 1978)
- Subgenus Neobironella Tenorio, 1977
  - Bironella confusa Bonne-Wepster, 1951
  - Bironella papuae (Swellengrebel & Swellengrebel de Graaf, 1919)
  - Bironella derooki Soesilo & van Slooten, 1931, syn. Bironella soesiloi (Strickland & Chowdhury, 1931)

== Phylogenetic relationships ==
The phylogenetic placement of the genus Bironella within the subfamily Anophelinae remains unclear as of January 2026. Based particularly on morphological evidence, Bironella appears to be the sister taxon to the genus Anopheles with Chagasia forming the outgroup. Other studies suggest that Bironella falls within the genus Anopheles.

== Disease transmission ==
The biting habits of adult members of the genus are not well known. Only one species, Bironella gracilis, has been reported to bite humans either in the wild or in laboratory studies. Unlike species of Anopheles, no evidence has been found that any Bironella species is involved in disease transmission.

== See also ==
- List of mosquito genera
- Taxonomy of Anopheles
