= Bironella papuae =

Scientific classification
- Kingdom: Animalia
- Phylum: Arthropoda
- Class: Insecta
- Order: Diptera
- Family: Culicidae
- Genus: Bironella
- Species: B. papuae

Binomial name
- Bironella papuae (Swell. & Swellengrebel de Graaf, 1919)

Species of fly

Bironella papuae is a mosquito species in the subgenus Neobironella of the genus Bironella.
