= Bironella obscura =

Scientific classification
- Kingdom: Animalia
- Phylum: Arthropoda
- Class: Insecta
- Order: Diptera
- Family: Culicidae
- Genus: Bironella
- Species: B. obscura

Binomial name
- Bironella obscura Tenorio, 1975

Species of mosquito

Bironella obscura is a mosquito species in the subgenus Brugella of the genus Bironella. It is found in New Guinea. It was first described in 1975.
