= Chagasia bathana =

Scientific classification
- Kingdom: Animalia
- Phylum: Arthropoda
- Class: Insecta
- Order: Diptera
- Family: Culicidae
- Genus: Chagasia
- Species: C. bathana

Binomial name
- Chagasia bathana (Dyar, 1928)

Synonyms
- Anopheles bathanus Dyar, 1928

Species of mosquito

Chagasia bathana is a mosquito species in the genus Chagasia.

It is found in Belize, Colombia, Costa Rica, Ecuador, Guatemala, Mexico, Nicaragua, Panama, Peru, Venezuela and French Guiana.

Chagasia bathana is a mosquito species with eight chromosomes. The 2n=6 chromosome number is conserved in the entire family Culicidae, except in Chagasia bathana which has 2n=8.
