= Bironella confusa =

Scientific classification
- Kingdom: Animalia
- Phylum: Arthropoda
- Class: Insecta
- Order: Diptera
- Family: Culicidae
- Genus: Bironella
- Species: B. confusa

Binomial name
- Bironella confusa Bonne-Wepster, 1951

Synonyms
- Anopheles confusa Bonne-Wepster, 1951

Species of mosquito

Bironella confusa is a mosquito species in the genus Bironella. It has been placed in different subgenera, including Neobironella.

== Taxonomy ==
The species was first described in 1951 by J. Bonne-Wepster, who showed that a male specimen had previously been wrongly described as Bironella soesiloi (a synonym of Bironella derooki), and so published a new name, Bironella confusa. A 1963 paper placed the species in subgenus Bironella. In 1977, it was placed in a new subgenus Neobironella.
