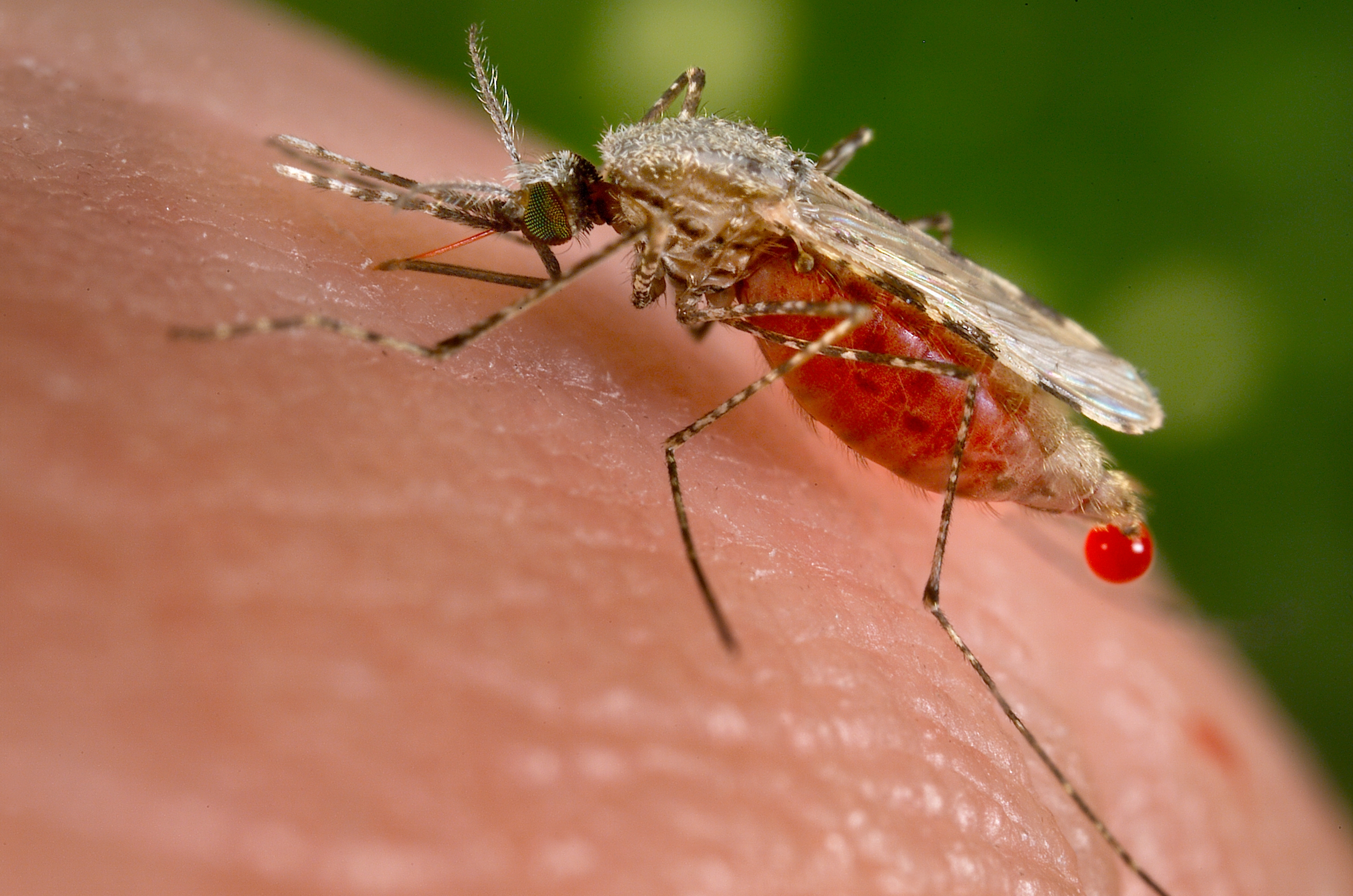
- Anopheles stephensi, female

Scientific classification
- Kingdom: Animalia
- Phylum: Arthropoda
- Clade: Pancrustacea
- Class: Insecta
- Order: Diptera
- Family: Culicidae
- Subfamily: Anophelinae
- Genus: Anopheles; Meigen 1818

Species
- For a full description, see the main article: Taxonomy of Anopheles

= Anopheles =

Genus of mosquito

Anopheles (/əˈnɒfɪliːz/) is a genus of mosquito first described by the German entomologist J. W. Meigen in 1818, and are known as nail mosquitoes and marsh mosquitoes. Many such mosquitoes are vectors of the parasite Plasmodium, a genus of protozoans that cause malaria in birds, reptiles, and mammals, including humans. The Anopheles gambiae mosquito is the best-known species of marsh mosquito that transmits the Plasmodium falciparum, which is a malarial parasite deadly to human beings; no other mosquito genus is a vector of human malaria.

The genus Anopheles diverged from other mosquitoes approximately 100 million years ago (mya), and, like other mosquitoes, the eggs, larvae, and pupae are aquatic. The Anopheles larva has no respiratory siphon through which to breathe, so it breathes and feeds with its body horizontal to the surface of the water. The adult mosquito hatches from the surface and feeds on the nectar of flowers; the female mosquito also feeds on blood, which animal diet allows them to carry and transmit parasites between hosts. The adult's feeding position is head-down, unlike the horizontal stance of the culicines. Anopheles are distributed almost worldwide, throughout the tropics, the subtropics, and the temperate regions of planet Earth. In hot weather, adult Anopheles aestivate, which is a state of dormancy that enables the mosquito to survive in hot dry regions, such as the Sahel.

== Evolution ==
=== Fossil history ===
Fossils of the genus Anopheles are rare; only two had been found by 2015. They are Anopheles (Nyssorhynchus) dominicanus Zavortink & Poinar in Dominican Republic amber from the Late Eocene (40.4 million years ago to 33.9 million years ago), and Anopheles rottensis Statz in German amber from the Late Oligocene (28.4 million years ago to 23 million years ago).

=== Phylogeny ===
The ancestors of all flies including mosquitoes appeared 260 million years ago. The culicine and Anopheles clades of mosquitoes diverged between 120 million years ago and 150 million years ago. The Old and New World Anopheles species subsequently diverged between 80 million years ago and 95 million years ago. Anopheles darlingi diverged from the African and Asian malaria vectors ~100 million years ago. The cladogram is based on an analysis of mosquito genomes by Heafsey and colleagues in 2015:

- Diptera 260 mya
  - Culicidae mosquitoes
    - Anopheles 100 mya
      - - subgenus Cellia
          - - subgenus Pyretophorus 30 mya
              - gambiae complex (Africa)
              - A. epirotus & spp.
            - A. stephensi & spp.
          - A. dirus & spp.
        - subgenus Anopheles
      - subgenus Nyssorhynchus (Americas)
    - Culicinae
  - all other flies
    Muscomorpha

=== Taxonomy ===
The genus name Anopheles was introduced by the German entomologist Johann Wilhelm Meigen in 1818. He described two species, A. birfurcatus and the type species, Anopheles maculipennis. He stated that the name meant beschwerlich, "burdensome". The name comes from the Ancient Greek word ἀνωφελής anōphelḗs 'useless', derived from ἀν- an-, 'not', 'un-' and ὄφελος óphelos 'profit'.

The taxonomy of the genus was greatly advanced in 1901 when the English entomologist Frederick Vincent Theobald described 39 Anopheles species in his 5-volume monograph on the Culicidae. He was provided with mosquito specimens sent in to the British Museum (Natural History) from around the world, on the 1898 instruction of the Secretary of State for the Colonies, Joseph Chamberlain.

Anopheles (with a nearly worldwide distribution) belongs to the subfamily Anophelinae alongside two other genera: Bironella (restricted to Australasia) and Chagasia (restricted to the Neotropics). The taxonomy remains incompletely settled. Classification into species is based on morphological characteristics – wing spots, head anatomy, larval and pupal anatomy, chromosome structure, and more recently, on DNA sequences. In the taxonomy published by Harbach and Kitching in 2016, it was shown that three species of Bironella (B. confusa, B. gracilis, and B. hollandi) are phylogenetically more similar to A. kyondawensis than other Bironella species. That phylogeny argues that, based on genetic similarity, A. implexus is divergent from the common ancestor of Anopheles.

== Life cycle ==
Like all mosquitoes, anophelines go through four stages in their life cycles: egg, larva, pupa, and adult. The first three stages are aquatic and together last 5–14 days, depending on the species and the ambient temperature. The adult stage is when the female Anopheles acts as malaria vector. The adult females can live up to a month (or more in captivity), but most probably do not live more than two weeks in nature.

=== Eggs ===
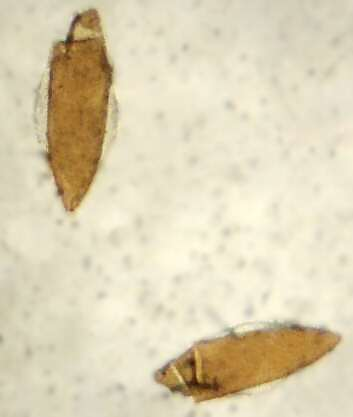
Anopheles eggs with their distinctive side floats

Adult females lay 50–200 eggs per oviposition. The eggs are quite small (about 0.5 millimetres (0.02 in) × 0.2 millimetres (0.008 in)). Eggs are laid singly and directly on to water. They are unique in that they have floats on either side. Eggs are not resistant to drying and hatch within 2–3 days, although hatching may take up to 2–3 weeks in colder climates.

=== Larvae ===
The mosquito larva has a well-developed head with mouth brushes used for feeding, a large thorax and a nine-segment abdomen. It has no legs. In contrast to other mosquitoes, the Anopheles larva lacks a respiratory siphon, so it positions itself so that its body is parallel to the surface of the water. In contrast, the feeding larva of culicine mosquitoes attach themselves to the water surface with the posterior siphon, the body pointing downwards. Larvae breathe through spiracles located on the eighth abdominal segment and so must come to the surface frequently. The larvae spend most of their time feeding on algae, bacteria, and other microorganisms in the thin surface layer. They dive below the surface only when disturbed. Larvae swim either by jerky movements of the entire body or through propulsion with the mouth brushes.

Larvae develop through four stages, or instars, after which they metamorphose into pupae. At the end of each instar, the larvae molt, shedding their exoskeletons, or skin, to allow for further growth. The larvae occur in a wide range of habitats, but most species prefer clean, unpolluted water. Larvae of Anopheles have been found in freshwater or saltwater marshes, mangrove swamps, rice fields, grassy ditches, the edges of streams and rivers, and small, temporary rain pools. Many species prefer habitats with vegetation. Others prefer habitats with none. Some breed in open, sun-lit pools, while others are found only in shaded breeding sites in forests. A few species breed in tree holes or the leaf axils of some plants.

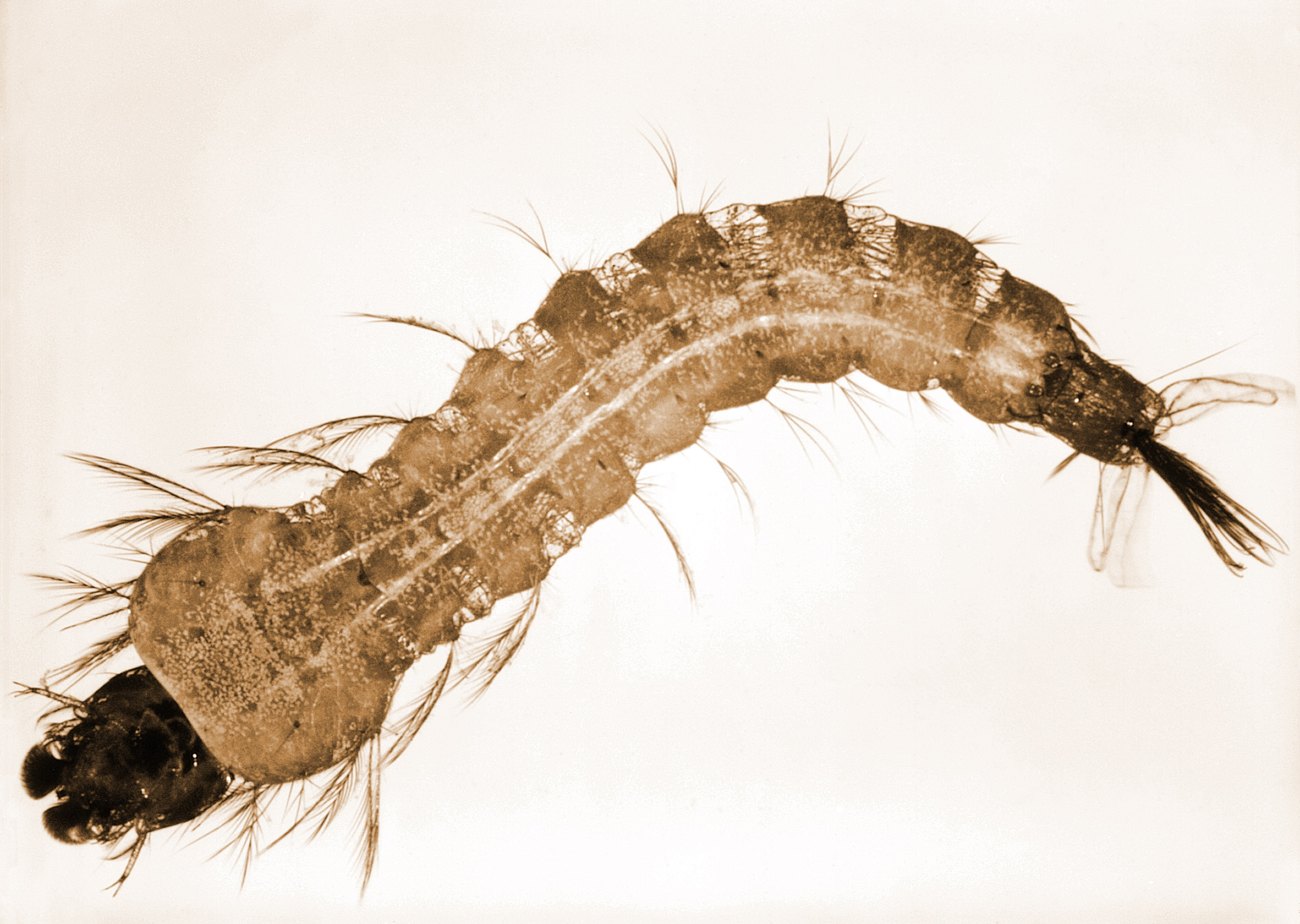
Anopheles larva

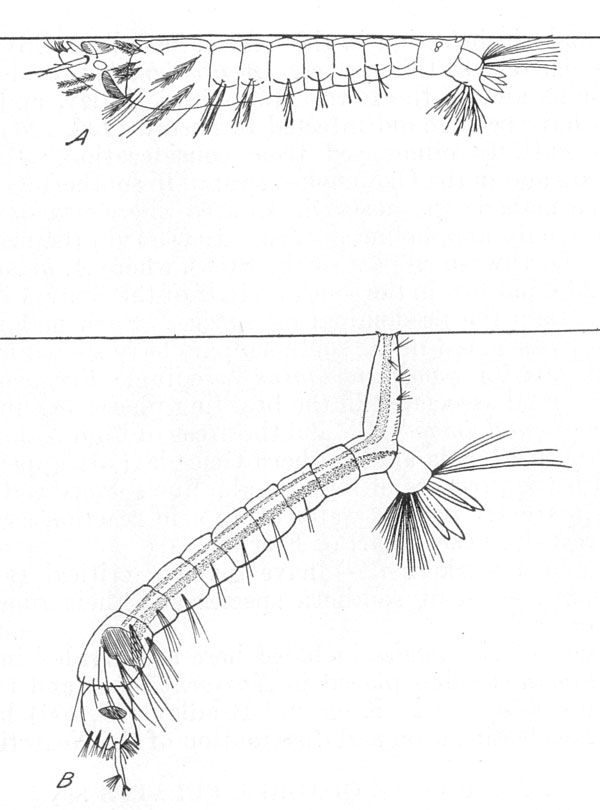
Feeding position of an Anopheles larva (A), culicine larva with its siphon (B)

=== Pupae ===
The pupa (also known as a tumbler) is comma-shaped when viewed from the side. The head and thorax are merged into a cephalothorax, with the abdomen curving around underneath it. As with the larvae, the pupa must come to the surface frequently to breathe, which it does through a pair of respiratory trumpets on its cephalothorax. After a few days as a pupa, the dorsal surface of the cephalothorax splits and the adult mosquito emerges.

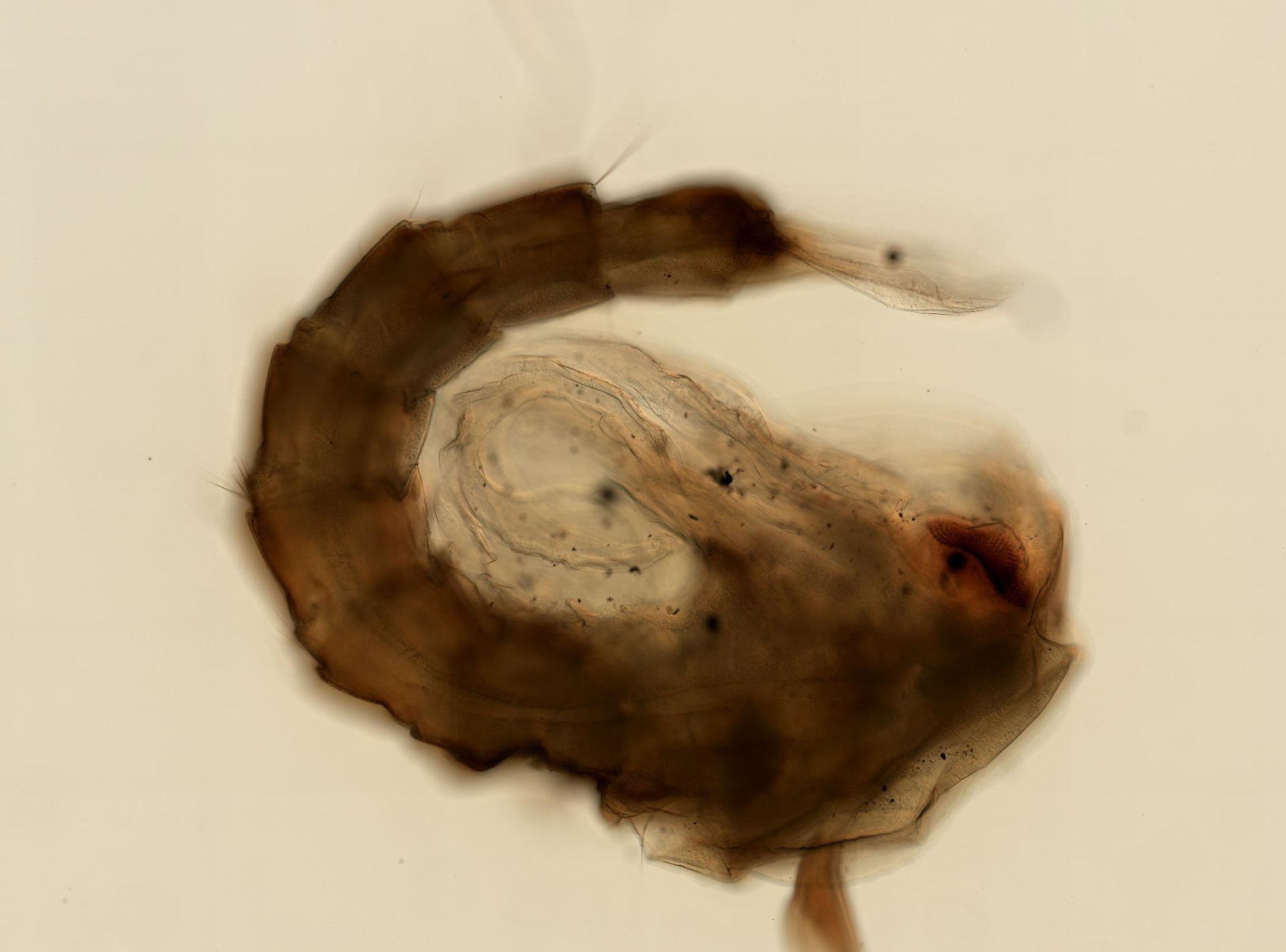
Pupa

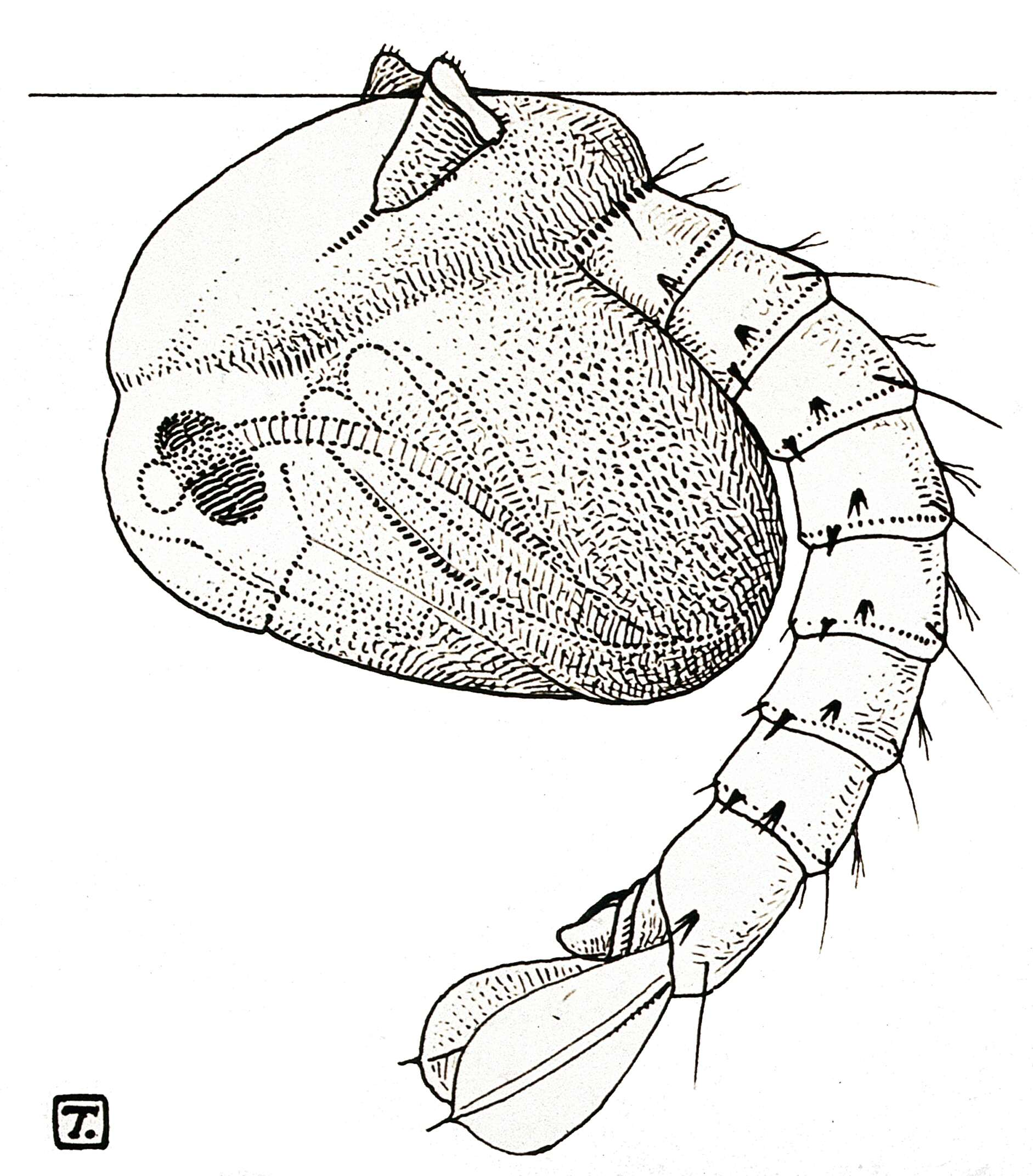
A. maculipennis pupa, breathing at the surface

=== Adults ===
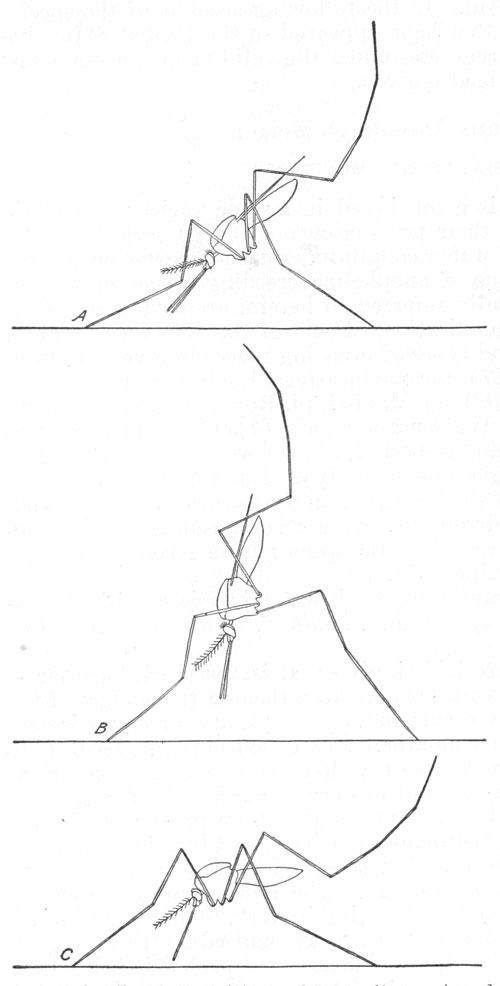
Resting positions of adult Anopheles (A, B) are more upright than that of Culicinae (C).

Like all mosquitoes, adult Anopheles species have slender bodies with three sections: head, thorax and abdomen. The head is specialized for acquiring sensory information and for feeding. It contains the eyes and a pair of long, many-segmented antennae. The antennae are important for detecting host odours, as well as of breeding sites where females lay eggs. Female mosquitoes carrying Plasmodium parasites, the causative agents of malaria, are significantly more attracted to human breath and odours than uninfected mosquitoes. The head has an elongated, forward-projecting proboscis used for feeding, and two maxillary palps. These palps carry the receptors for carbon dioxide, a major attractant that enables the mosquito to locate its host. The thorax is specialized for locomotion. Three pairs of legs and a pair of wings are attached to the thorax. The abdomen is specialized for food digestion and egg development. This segmented body part expands considerably when a female takes a blood meal. The blood is digested over time, serving as a source of protein for the production of eggs, which gradually fill the abdomen.

Anopheles can be distinguished from other mosquitoes by the palps, which are as long as the proboscis, and by the presence of discrete blocks of black and white scales on the wings. Adults can further be identified by their typical resting position: both sexes rest with their abdomens pointing up, unlike culicine mosquitoes. Adult mosquitoes usually mate within a few days after emerging from the pupal stage. In most species, the males form large swarms, usually around dusk, and the females fly into the swarms to mate. The duration from egg to adult varies considerably among species, and is strongly influenced by ambient temperature. Mosquitoes can develop from egg to adult in as little as five days, but it can take 10–14 days in tropical conditions.

Males live for about a week, feeding on nectar and other sources of sugar. Males cannot feed on blood, as it appears to produce toxic effects and kills them within a few days, around the same lifespan as a water-only diet. Females feed on sugar sources for energy, but usually require a blood meal for the development of eggs. After obtaining a full blood meal, the female rests for a few days while the blood is digested and eggs are developed. This process depends on the temperature, but usually takes 2–3 days in tropical conditions. Once the eggs are fully developed, the female lays them and resumes host-seeking. The cycle repeats itself until the female dies. While females can live longer than a month in captivity, most do not live longer than one to two weeks in nature. Their lifespans depend on temperature, humidity, and their ability to successfully obtain a blood meal while avoiding host defenses.

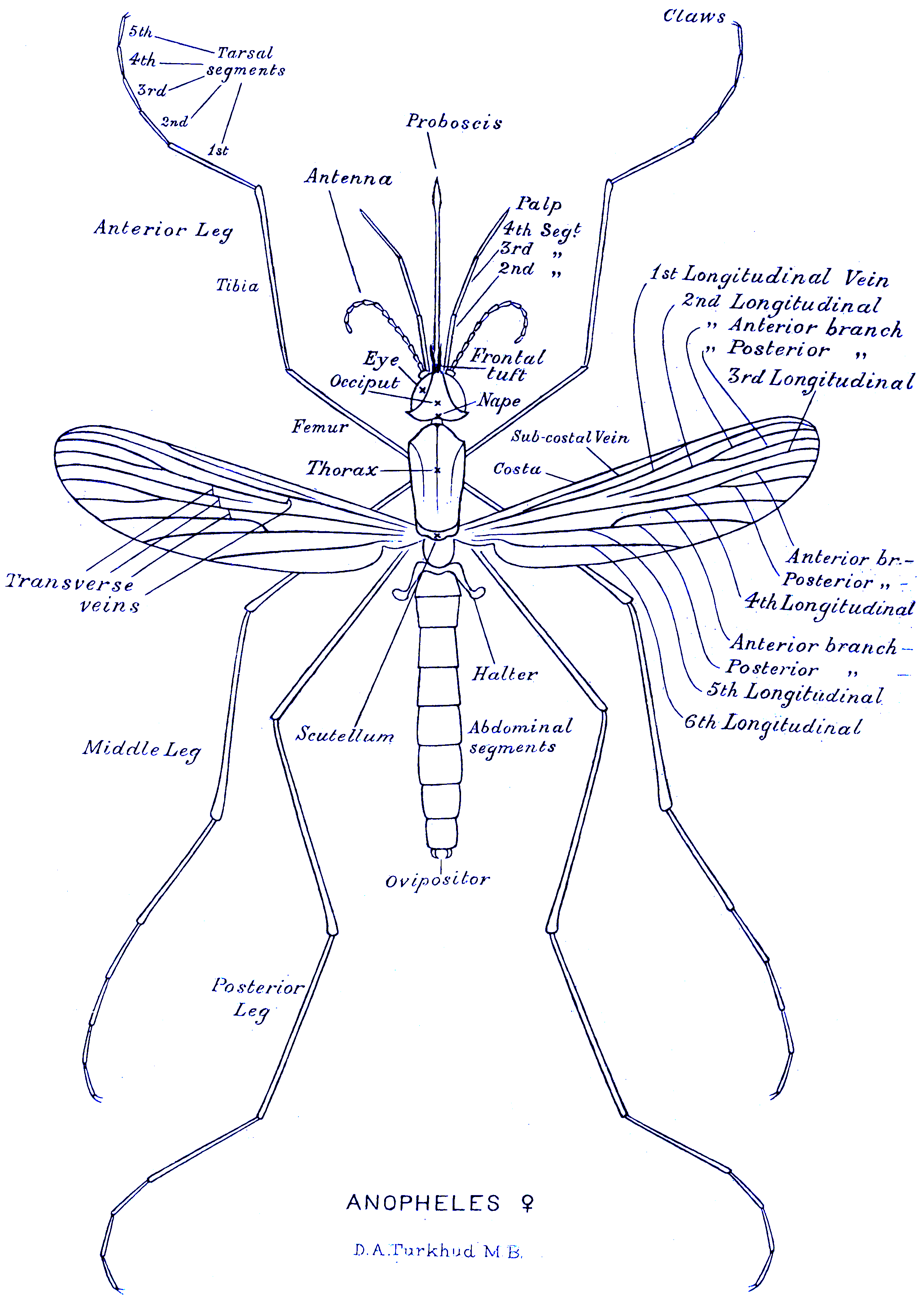
Morphology of female Anopheles

== Ecology ==
=== Distribution ===
Anopheles species live both in tropical areas known for malaria such as sub-Saharan Africa, and in colder latitudes. Malaria outbreaks have in the past occurred in colder climates, for example during the construction of the Rideau Canal in Canada during the 1820s. Anopheles species that can transmit malaria are not limited to malaria-endemic areas, so areas where they have been eliminated are constantly at risk of reintroduction of the disease.

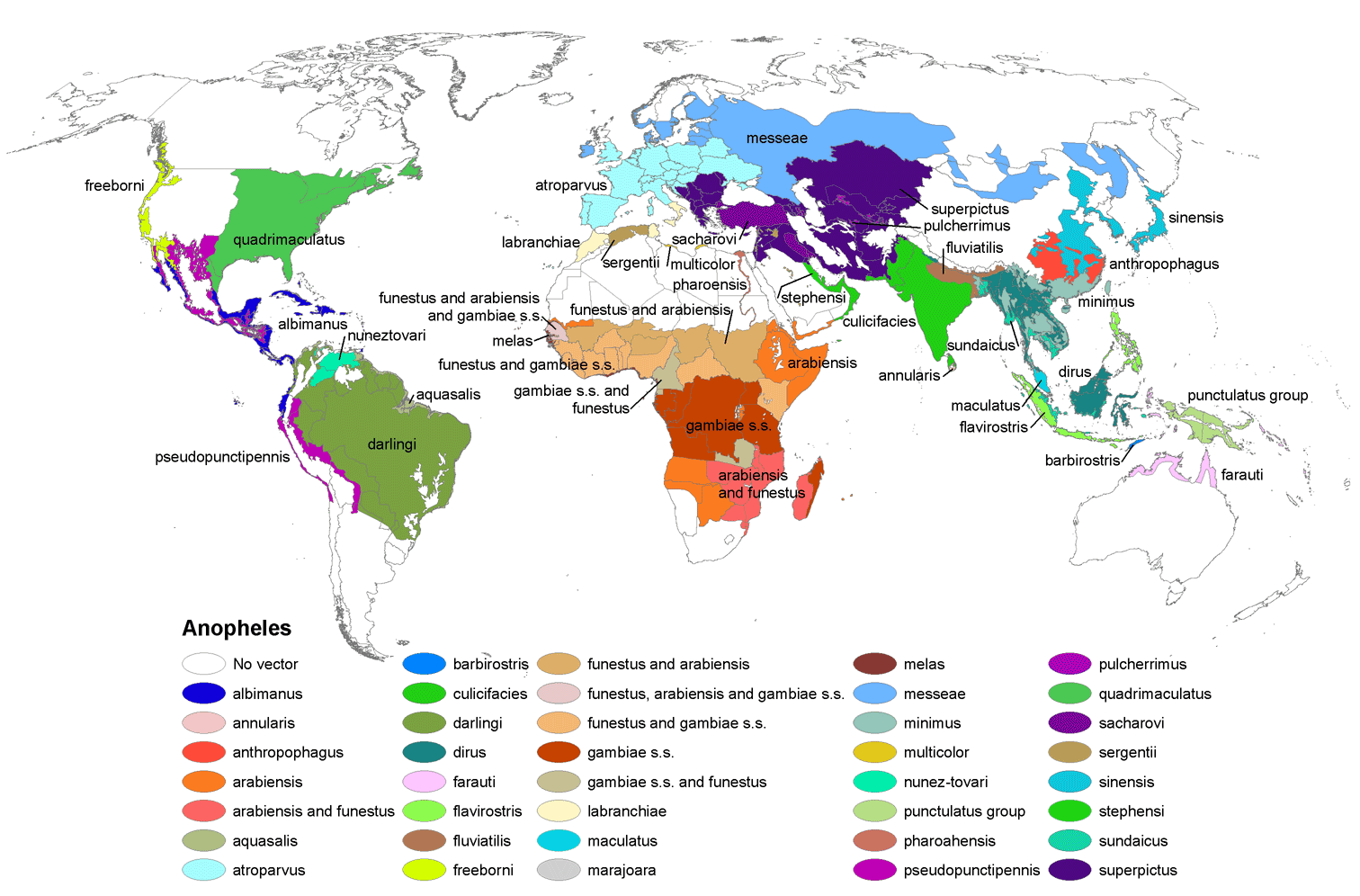
Global distribution of Anopheles species covers both the tropics with numerous malarias, and colder areas not subject to malaria at the start of the 21st century.

=== Habitat ===
Anopheles require bodies of water, possibly small and seasonal, for their aquatic larvae and pupae. Suitable habitats range from ponds to water tanks, swamps, ditches and puddles. The adults can however live in dry regions such as Africa's savanna and Sahel. They can travel far from water, and are sometimes blown hundreds of kilometres by suitable winds. Adults can aestivate for months at a time, becoming dormant in hot dry weather, allowing them to persist through the African dry season. Further, Anopheles have been documented travelling in baggage, such as on aircraft.

=== Parasites ===
Parasites of Anopheles include Microsporidia of the genera Amblyospora, Crepidulospora, Senoma and Parathelohania. Two distinct life cycles are found in the Microsporidia. In the first type, the parasite is transmitted by the oral route and is relatively species nonspecific. In the second, while again the oral route is the usual route of infection, the parasite is ingested within an already infected intermediate host. Infection of the insect larval form is frequently tissue-specific, and commonly involves the fat body. Vertical (transovarial) transmission also occurs.

The parasitic Wolbachia bacteria have been studied for use as control agents.

=== Predators ===
The jumping spider Evarcha culicivora indirectly feeds on vertebrate blood by preying on female Anopheles. Juvenile spiders choose the Anopheles over all other prey regardless of whether it actually is carrying blood. Juvenile spiders have adopted an Anopheles-specific prey-capture behavior, using the posture of Anopheles as a primary cue to identify them. Anopheles has a distinctive resting posture with its abdomen angled up. In this case, the spider approaches from behind the mosquito and under its abdomen, and then attacks from below.

== Malaria vectors ==
=== Preferred sources for blood meals ===
Since the genus Anopheles is the sole vector for malaria, it has been studied intensively in the search for effective control methods. One important behavioral factor is the degree to which an Anopheles species prefers to feed on humans (anthropophily) or animals such as cattle or birds (zoophily). Anthropophilic Anopheles are more likely to transmit the malaria parasites from one person to another. Most Anopheles are not exclusively anthropophilic or zoophilic, including the primary malaria vector in the western United States, A. freeborni. However, the primary malaria vectors in Africa, A. gambiae and A. funestus, are strongly anthropophilic and are consequently major vectors of human malaria.

=== Probability of transmitting malaria ===
Once ingested by a mosquito, malaria parasites must undergo development within the mosquito before they are infectious to humans. The time required for the parasite to develop in the mosquito (the extrinsic incubation period) ranges from 10 to 21 days, depending on the parasite species and the temperature. If a mosquito does not survive long enough for the parasite to develop, then she transmits no parasites.

It is not possible to measure directly the lifespans of mosquitoes in nature, but indirect estimates of daily survivorship have been made for several Anopheles species. Estimates of daily survivorship in Tanzania of A. gambiae, the vector of the dangerous Plasmodium falciparum parasite, ranged from 0.77 to 0.84, meaning that after one day, between 77% and 84% have survived. Assuming this survivorship is constant through the adult life of a mosquito, less than 10% of female A. gambiae would survive longer than a 14-day extrinsic incubation period. If daily survivorship increased to 0.9, over 20% of mosquitoes would survive longer than the same period. Control measures that rely on insecticides (e.g. indoor residual spraying) may actually impact malaria transmission more through their effect on adult longevity than through their effect on the population of adult mosquitoes.

=== Patterns of feeding and resting ===
Most Anopheles are crepuscular (active at dusk or dawn) or nocturnal (active at night). Some feed indoors (endophagic), while others feed outdoors (exophagic). After feeding, some blood mosquitoes prefer to rest indoors (endophilic), while others prefer to rest outdoors (exophilic). Biting by nocturnal, endophagic Anopheles can be markedly reduced through the use of insecticide-treated bed nets or through improved housing construction to prevent mosquito entry (e.g. window screens). Endophilic mosquitoes are readily controlled by indoor spraying of residual insecticides. In contrast, exophagic/exophilic vectors are best controlled by destroying breeding sites, such as by filling in ponds.

=== Gut flora ===
Because transmission of disease by the mosquito requires ingestion of blood, the gut flora may have a bearing on the success of infection of the mosquito host. The larval and pupal gut is largely colonized by photosynthetic cyanobacteria, while in the adult, gram-negative bacteria in the Pseudomonadota and Bacteroidota phyla predominate. Blood meals drastically reduce the diversity of microorganisms in the gut, favouring bacteria.

== Control ==
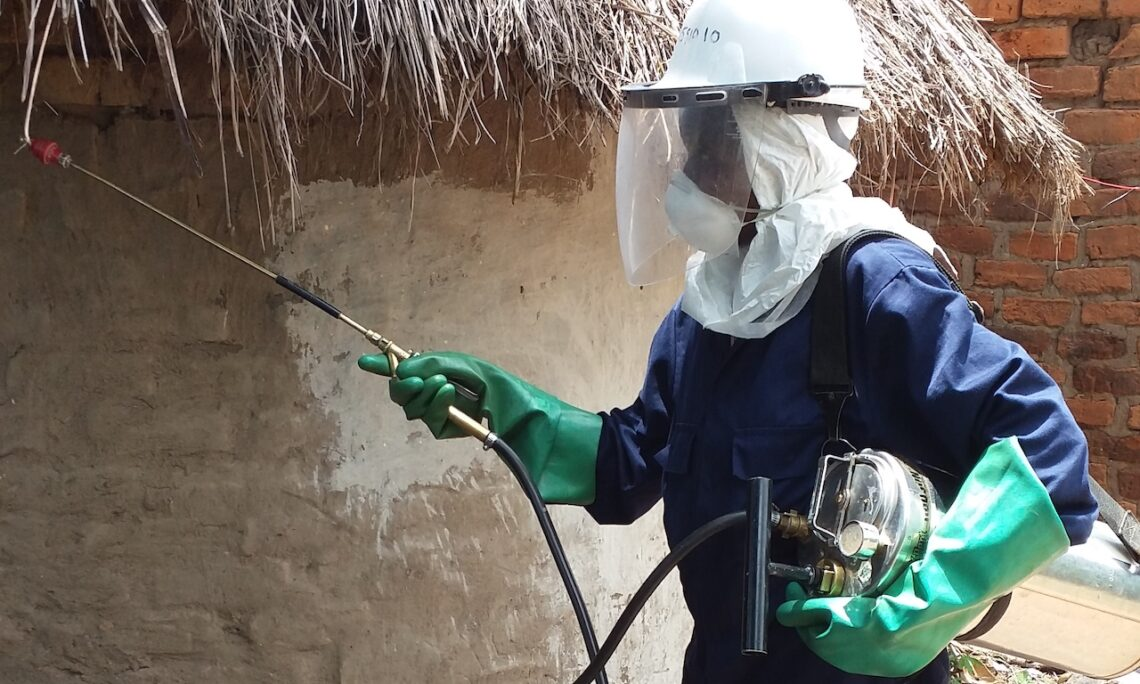
Person wearing personal protective equipment performing indoor residual spraying on a house to prevent malaria.

=== Insecticide control and resistance ===
Insecticides have offered a first line of approach to ridding areas of malarial mosquitoes. However, mosquitoes, with a short generation time, may rapidly evolve resistance, as experienced during the Global Malaria Eradication Campaign of the 1950s. The use of insecticides in agriculture has resulted in resistance in mosquito populations, implying that an effective control program must monitor for resistance and switch to other means if resistance is detected.

=== Eradication ===
In 2016, a CRISPR-Cas9 gene drive system was proposed to eradicate Anopheles gambiae, by deleting the dsx gene, causing female sterility. Such a gene drive system has been shown to suppress an entire caged A. gambiae population within 7–11 generations, typically less than a year. This has raised concerns with both the efficiency of a gene drive system as well as the ethical and ecological impact of such an eradication program. Therefore, there have been efforts to use the gene drive system to more efficiently introduce genes of Plasmodium resistance into the species, such as targeting and knocking out the FREP1 gene in Anopheles gambiae. Researchers in Burkina Faso have created a strain of the fungus Metarhizium pinghaense that is genetically engineered to produce the venom of an Australian funnel-web spider; exposure to the fungus caused populations of Anopheles to crash by 99% in a controlled trial.

== See also ==
- Tropical disease
