= Metarhizium pinghaense =

Scientific classification
- Kingdom: Fungi
- Division: Ascomycota
- Class: Sordariomycetes
- Order: Hypocreales
- Family: Clavicipitaceae
- Genus: Metarhizium
- Species: M. pinghaense

Binomial name
- Metarhizium pinghaense Q.T. Chen & H.L. Guo

Synonyms
- Metarhizium pingshaense (orth. var.)

Species of fungus

Metarhizium pinghaense is a species of entomopathogenic fungus in the family Clavicipitaceae. Some authorities have it as a synonym of Metarhizium anisopliae. DNA studies show that it is a good species, with strong bootstrap support.

Researchers in Burkina Faso have created a strain of M. metarhizium genetically engineered to produce the venom of an Australian funnel-web spider; exposure to the fungus caused populations of anopheles mosquitoes, which spread malaria, to crash by 99% in a controlled trial.
