= Bironella simmondsi =

Scientific classification
- Kingdom: Animalia
- Phylum: Arthropoda
- Clade: Pancrustacea
- Class: Insecta
- Order: Diptera
- Family: Culicidae
- Genus: Bironella
- Species: B. simmondsi

Binomial name
- Bironella simmondsi Tenorio, 1977

Species of fly

Bironella simmondsi is a species of mosquito belonging to the genus Bironella. It is predominantly found in Australia (specifically Queensland), though it has also been recorded in Papua New Guinea.

The holotype male was first collected on 6 February 1964 at Dinner Creek near Innisfail, Queensland, and is preserved at the Queensland Museum. The species was scientifically described by Joaquin Agulto Tenorio in 1977, and was named after John Howard Simmonds.

== Research ==
Eight specimens of B. simmondsi were collected from 1996 to 1998 around the area of Cairns and processed for Alphavirus isolation, namely Ross River virus. Three specimens of the species were collected for the same reason between 2005 and 2008 in Cairns.

After Japanese encephalitis virus emerged in 1995 in the Torres Strait in Australia, 131 specimens of B. simmondsi were among the hundreds of thousands of mosquitoes collected between 1996 and 1998 in the nearby Western Province of Papua New Guinea to process for virus isolation.
