= Chagasia =

Scientific classification
- Kingdom: Animalia
- Phylum: Arthropoda
- Class: Insecta
- Order: Diptera
- Family: Culicidae
- Subfamily: Anophelinae
- Genus: Chagasia; Cruz, 1906

Type species
- Chagasia fajardi (Lutz, 1904)

Species
- Chagasia ablusa; Chagasia bathana; Chagasia bonneae; Chagasia fajardi; Chagasia rozeboomi

Genus of flies

Chagasia is one of the three mosquito genera in the subfamily Anophelinae. The other two genera are Anopheles (nearly worldwide distribution) and Bironella (Australasia only). The genus consists of five species in the Neotropical region. These include C. ablusa Harbach, C. bathana Dyar, C. bonneae Root, C. fajardi Lutz and C. rozeboomi Causey, Deane & Deane.

Bironella appears to be the sister taxon to Anopheles, with Chagasia forming the outgroup in this subfamily.

The species Chagasia bathana has 8 chromosomes and males are heterogametic with one long X chromosome and one short Y chromosome.

== See also ==
- List of mosquito genera
- Taxonomy of Anopheles

== Notes ==
- Cruz, O. G. 1906. Um novo genero da sub-familia Anophelina [sic]. Brazil-Médico 20: 199-200.
- Edwards, F. W. 1932. Genera Insectorum. Diptera. Family Culicidae. Fascicle 194. Belgium, 258 pp.
- Harbach, R.E.; Howard, T.M. 2009: Review of the genus Chagasia (Diptera: Culicidae: Anophelinae). Zootaxa, 2210: 1-25.
