= Bironella travestita =

Scientific classification
- Kingdom: Animalia
- Phylum: Arthropoda
- Clade: Pancrustacea
- Class: Insecta
- Order: Diptera
- Family: Culicidae
- Genus: Bironella
- Species: B. travestita

Binomial name
- Bironella travestita (Brug, 1928)

Synonyms
- Anopheles travestita Brug, 1928

Species of fly

Bironella travestita is a species of mosquito that belongs to the family Culicidae. Within genus Bironella, it was a member of the subgenus Brugella.
