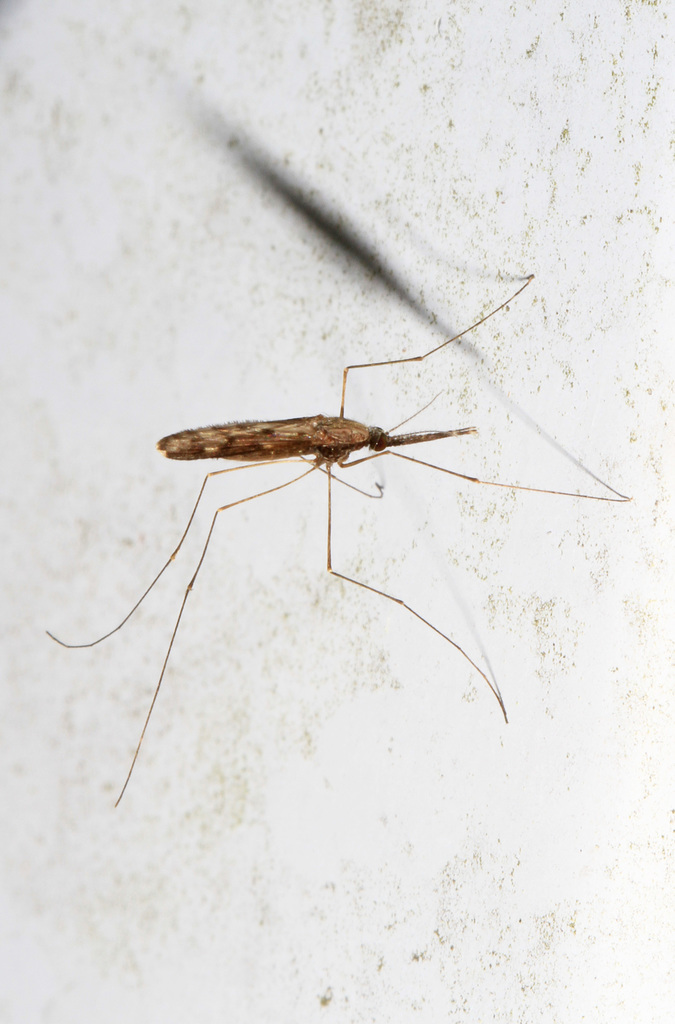

Scientific classification
- Kingdom: Animalia
- Phylum: Arthropoda
- Clade: Pancrustacea
- Class: Insecta
- Order: Diptera
- Family: Culicidae
- Genus: Anopheles
- Subgenus: Anopheles
- Species: A. crucians

Binomial name
- Anopheles crucians Wiedemann, C.R., 1828

= Anopheles crucians =

Species of mosquito

Anopheles crucians is a mosquito that exists in aquatic environments under areas with little light presence. The preferred environment for A. crucians is areas with acidic water such as those found in cypress swamps. The mosquito breeds in semipermanent and permanent pools, ponds, lakes and swamps.

It may be a vector for malaria.

== Anatomy ==
The anatomy of A. crucians is very similar to that of Anopheles bradleyi. The proboscis is dark colored and black. The pedipalps, composed of six segments, have different colors by segment. The basal part is black with raised scales, the third segment has white scales, the fourth is white-ringed basally and apically, and the last segment is white. The abdomen ranges from dark brown to black with hundreds of yellow to dark-brown hairs. The legs are dark with white patches in the femora and tibiae. The wings, on average, are 4.0 millimeters in length and have white-yellow scales with contrasting spots.

== Malaria vector ==
In research conducted by W.V. King in 1916, it was discovered that Anopheles female mosquitoes are carriers of malaria. In this research, 75% of A. crucians individuals were infected with oocysts, sporozoites, or both of the malarial parasite Plasmodium falciparum.
