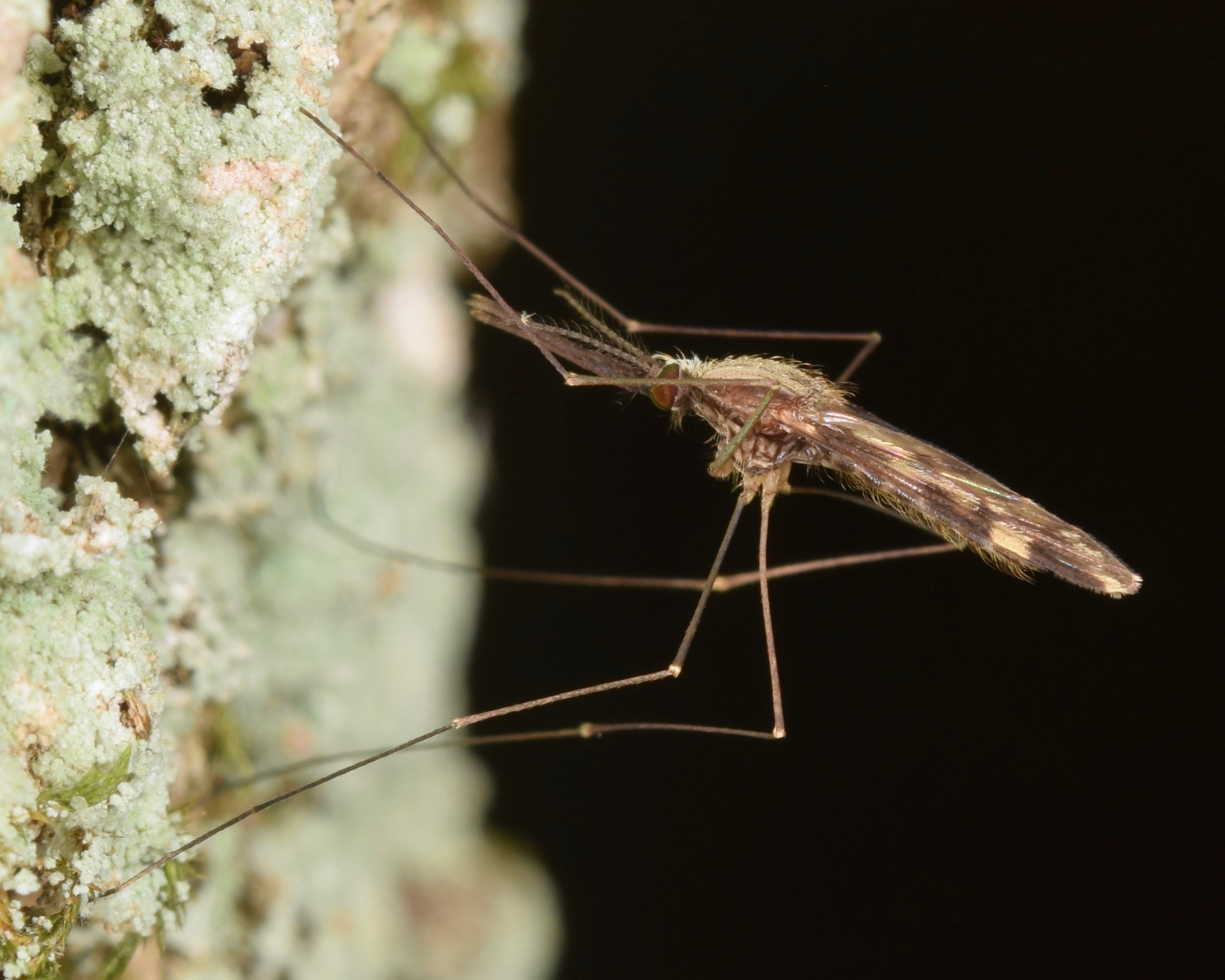

Scientific classification
- Kingdom: Animalia
- Phylum: Arthropoda
- Class: Insecta
- Order: Diptera
- Family: Culicidae
- Genus: Anopheles
- Subgenus: Anopheles
- Species: A. punctipennis

Binomial name
- Anopheles punctipennis (Say, 1823)

Synonyms
- Culex hyemalis; Culex punctipennis

= Anopheles punctipennis =

Species of mosquito

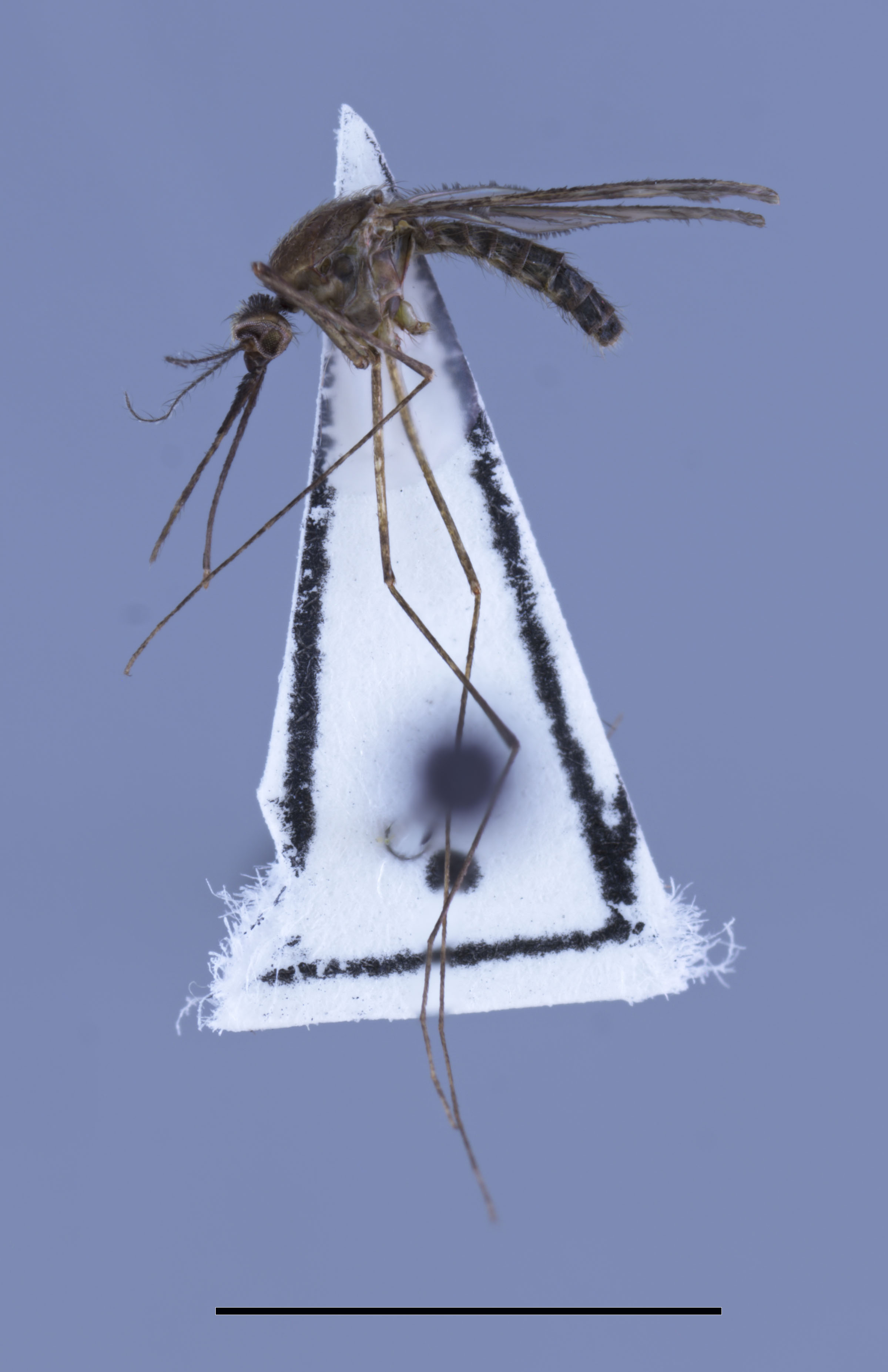
Anopheles punctipennis (Say, 1823). Order Diptera. Family Culicidae. Scale bar is 0.5mm. Collected in GA, Baldwin Co., Lake Laurel, on 4 Oct 2024 by Kaitlin Acosta.

Anopheles punctipennis, commonly called the woodland malaria mosquito, is a species of mosquito native to and found throughout North America.

== Ecology ==
The larvae of this species can be found in many kinds of natural and artificial water bodies, especially cool, clear waters such as streams. Females feed on blood, including the blood of humans, and may bite during the day or night. They generally stay outdoors and are rarely found inside dwellings.

== Medical importance ==
This species vectors P. vivax and P. falciparum, two protozoan species that cause human malaria.
