= Bironella derooki =

Scientific classification
- Kingdom: Animalia
- Phylum: Arthropoda
- Class: Insecta
- Order: Diptera
- Family: Culicidae
- Genus: Bironella
- Species: B. derooki

Binomial name
- Bironella derooki Soesilo & van Slooten, 1931

Synonyms
- Anopheles soesiloi Strickland & Chowdhury, 1931; Bironella soesiloi (Strickland & Chowdhury, 1931)

Species of mosquito

Bironella derooki, synonym Bironella soesiloi, is a species of mosquito belonging to the genus Bironella. It is placed in the subgenus Neobironella.

== Taxonomy ==
Bironella derooki and Anopheles soesilo (the original combination of Bironella soesiloi) were both first described in 1931. Sources differ as to which specific name they consider has priority. Tenorio in 1977 treated the species as Bironella soesiloi. As of January 2026 so did the Interim Register of Marine and Nonmarine Genera, whereas the Integrated Taxonomic Information System and the Global Biodiversity Information Facility treated the species as Bironella derooki.
