= Bironella hollandi =

Scientific classification
- Kingdom: Animalia
- Phylum: Arthropoda
- Clade: Pancrustacea
- Class: Insecta
- Order: Diptera
- Family: Culicidae
- Genus: Bironella
- Species: B. hollandi

Binomial name
- Bironella hollandi Taylor, 1934

Species of fly

Bironella hollandi is a mosquito species in the subgenus Brugella of the genus Bironella.
