= Bironella gracilis =

Scientific classification
- Kingdom: Animalia
- Phylum: Arthropoda
- Class: Insecta
- Order: Diptera
- Family: Culicidae
- Genus: Bironella
- Species: B. gracilis

Binomial name
- Bironella gracilis Theobald, 1905

Species of fly

Bironella gracilis is a mosquito species in the genus Bironella. It has been placed in the subgenus Bironella.
