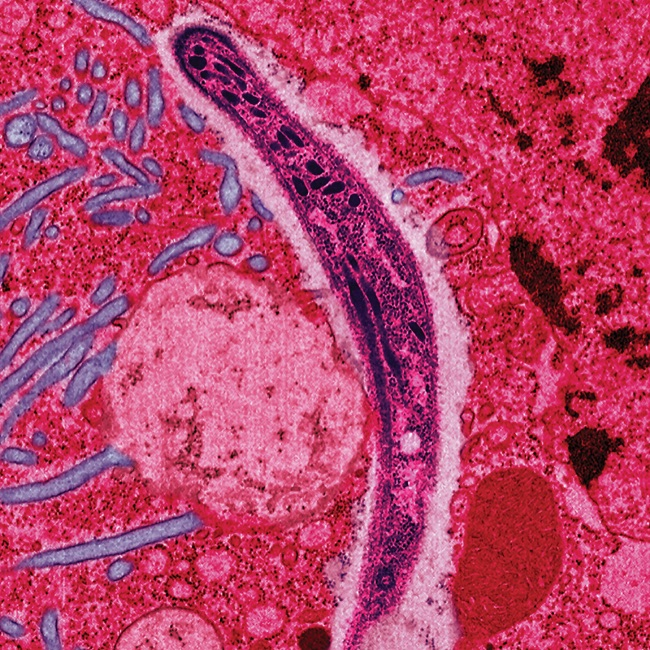
- False-colored electron micrograph of a sporozoite

Scientific classification
- Domain: Eukaryota
- Supergroup: Alveolata
- Phylum: Apicomplexa
- Class: Aconoidasida
- Order: Haemospororida
- Family: Plasmodiidae
- Genus: Plasmodium; Marchiafava & Celli, 1885

Subgenera
- Plasmodium (Bennettinia); Plasmodium (Carinamoeba); Plasmodium (Giovannolaia); Plasmodium (Haemamoeba); Plasmodium (Huffia); Plasmodium (Lacertamoeba); Plasmodium (Laverania); Plasmodium (Novyella); Plasmodium (Paraplasmodium); Plasmodium (Plasmodium); Plasmodium (Sauramoeba); Plasmodium (Vinckeia)

= List of Plasmodium species =

The genus Plasmodium is a member of the order Haemosporidia. It is the largest genus within this order and currently consists of over 250 species. They cause malaria in many different vertebrates.

The species in this genus are entirely parasitic with part of their life cycle spent in a vertebrate host and another in an invertebrate host - usually a mosquito. Vertebrates infected by members of this genus include mammals, birds and reptiles.

Host range among the mammalian orders is non uniform. At least 29 species infect non human primates; rodents outside the tropical parts of Africa are rarely affected; a few species are known to infect bats, porcupines and squirrels; carnivores, insectivores and marsupials are not known to act as hosts.

The listing of host species among the reptiles has rarely been attempted. Ayala in 1978 listed 156 published accounts on 54 valid species and subspecies between 1909 and 1975. The regional breakdown was Africa: 30 reports on 9 species; Australia, Asia and Oceania: 12 reports on 6 species and 2 subspecies; Americas: 116 reports on 37 species.

== Diagnostic criteria of the order Haemosporida ==
Currently there are ~550 species recognised in this order organised into 17 genera.

The diagnostic criteria of this family are:

- macrogametes and microgamonts develop independently
- syzygy is absent
- microgametocyte produces 8 flagellated microgametes
- zygote is motile (known as an ookinete)
- conoid present in ookinete stage only
- sporozoites naked in oocyst (that is without a sporocyst)
- heteroxenous: merogony and gamogony occur in vertebrate host and fertilization and sporogony in definitive host (a blood sucking insect)
- hemozoin pigment produced in some genera (including Plasmodium)

== Diagnostic criteria of the genus Plasmodium ==
- Merogony occurs both in erythrocytes and other tissues
- Merozoites, schizonts or gametocytes can be seen within erythrocytes and may displace the host nucleus
- Merozoites have a "signet-ring" appearance due to a large vacuole that forces the parasite's nucleus to one pole
- Schizonts are round to oval inclusions that contain the deeply staining merozoites
- Forms gamonts in erythrocytes
- Gametocytes are 'halter-shaped' similar to Haemoproteus but the pigment granules are more confined
- Hemozoin is present
- Vectors are either mosquitoes or sandflies (Lutzomyia).
- Vertebrate hosts include mammals, birds and reptiles

=== Note ===
Mammalian erythrocytes do not possess a nucleus. Although it has been suggested that the nucleus was lost in the erythrocytes better to enable them to traverse capillaries evidence for this is lacking. It appears that this loss along with the mitochondria that the erythrocytes also lose may protect the erythrocytes against oxidative stress.

== Subgenera ==
The full taxonomic name of a species includes the subgenus but this is often omitted in practice. The full name indicates some features of the morphology and type of host species. Sixteen subgenera are currently recognised.

The avian species were discovered soon after the description of P. falciparum and a variety of generic names were created. These were subsequently placed into the genus Plasmodium although some workers continued to use the genera Laverinia and Proteosoma for P. falciparum and the avian species respectively.

The 5th and 6th Congresses of Malaria held at Istanbul (1953) and Lisbon (1958) respectively recommended the creation and use of subgenera in this genus. Laverinia was applied to the species infecting humans and Haemamoeba to those infecting lizards and birds. This proposal was not universally accepted. Bray in 1955 proposed a definition for the subgenus Plasmodium and a second for the subgenus Laverinia in 1958. Garnham described a third subgenus - Vinckeia - in 1964.

In 1963 Corradetti, Garnham and Laird proposed a new classification of the avian malaria parasites. They created four sub-genera - Giovannolaia, Haemamoeba, Huffia and Novyella - based on the size of the schizonts, the gametocyte forms and the type of exo-erythrocytic schizogony.

Additional subgenera have been created since.

The currently recognised subgenera are listed below.

- Asiamoeba Telford 1988
- Bennettinia Valkiūnas 1997
- Carinamoeba Garnham 1966
- Giovannolaia Corradetti, Garnham & Laird 1963
- Haemamoeba Grassi & Feletti 1890
- Huffia Garnham & Laird 1963
- Lacertamoeba Telford 1988
- Laverania Bray 1958
- Novyella Corradetti, Garnham & Laird 1963
- Nyssorhynchus Poinar 2005
- Ophidiella Garnham 1966
- Papernaia Landau et al 2010
- Paraplasmodium Telford 1988
- Plasmodium Bray 1963 emend. Garnham 1964
- Sauramoeba Garnham 1966
- Vinckeia Garnham 1964

== Classification criteria for subgenera ==
The current classification scheme was developed prior to the widespread use of DNA sequence based taxonomy and is based on host and morphological criteria. Plasmodium has since been shown to be paraphytic with the genera Haemoproteus and Hepatocystis (vide infra). Revision of this genus will be undertaken once sufficient DNA sequence material is available.

This forthcoming reclassification project is not unique to this genus as DNA based taxonomy is revising many traditional groupings of protozoa.

The bird infecting taxa can be separated into two groups on the basis of the gametocytes: species with round gametocytes (Bennettinia, Haemamoeba) and species with elongated gametocytes (Giovanniola, Huffia and Novyella). The monophyly of the Bennettinia, Haemamoeba and Huffia subgenera was subsequently confirmed by molecular studies. The other two genera were found to be paraphytic. The genera were then revised and a new subgenus - Papernaia - was created.

=== Species with mammalian hosts ===
Laverania

Species in this subgenus infect higher primates (including man) and have characteristic sickle shaped female gametocytes.

The type species is Plasmodium falciparum.

Plasmodium

Species infecting higher primates other than those in the subgenus Laverania are placed in the subgenus Plasmodium.

The type species is Plasmodium malariae.

Vinckeia

Parasites infecting other mammals including lower primates (lemurs and others) are classified in the subgenus Vinckeia.

The type species is Plasmodium bubalis.

=== Species with avian hosts ===
Bennettinia

Schizonts contain scant cytoplasm, are often round, do not exceed the size of the host nucleus and stick to it. Gametocytes, while varying in shape tend to be round or oval, do not exceed the size of the nucleus and stick to it.

The type species is Plasmodium juxtanucleare.

Giovannolaia

Schizonts contain plentiful cytoplasm, are larger than the host cell nucleus and frequently displace it. They are found only in mature erythrocytes. Gametocytes are elongated. Exoerythrocytic schizogony occurs in the mononuclear phagocyte system.

The type species is Plasmodium circumflexum.

Haemamoeba

Mature schizonts are larger than the host cell nucleus and commonly displace it. Gametocytes are large, round, oval or irregular in shape and are substantially larger than the host nucleus.

The type species is Plasmodium relictum.

Huffia

Mature schizonts, while varying in shape and size, contain plentiful cytoplasm and are commonly found in immature erythryocytes. Gametocytes are elongated.

The type species is Plasmodium elongatum.

Novyella

Mature schizonts are either smaller than or only slightly larger than the host nucleus. They contain scanty cytoplasm. Gametocytes are elongated. Sexual stages in this subgenus resemble those of Haemoproteus. A white/blue globule is present in the cytoplasm. Exoerythrocytic schizogony occurs in the mononuclear phagocyte system

The type species is Plasmodium vaughani.

Papernaia

The gametocytes are elongated. The schizonts apically or lateroapically placed and are rounded or irregularly shaped. The host nucleus may be tilted.

The type species is Plasmodium polare

=== Species with reptilian hosts ===
Although over 3200 species of lizard have been identified as hosts to Plasmodium species, only 29 species of snakes have been. All snake infecting species are placed into the subgenus Ophidiella.

Asiamoeba

The schizonts and gametocytes are greatly disparate in size (4 to 15 times).

Carinamoeba

The schizonts are small and give rise to 8 or fewer merozoites. The gametocytes like the schizonts are small.

The type species is Plasmodium minasense.

Lacertamoeba

The schizonts are medium-sized and undergo 3 to 5 nuclear divisions. The gametocytes are medium-sized

Paraplasmodium

The schizonts are of medium size. Exoerythrocytic schizonts may be produced in both fixed and wandering host cells. The gametocytes are large. One species in this sub-genus is capable of merogony in a vector of the genus Lutzomyia.

Sauramoeba

Large schizonts giving rise to 12 or more merozoites. The gametocytes like the schizonts are large. The asexual stages tend to disappear from the lymphocytes once the gametocytes appear in the lymphocytes.

The type species is Plasmodium agamae.

Ophidiella

The species in this subgenus infect only snakes.

The type species is Plasmodium weyoni.

=== Species with unknown hosts ===
One species has been identified from Dominican amber - Plasmodium dominicum. The vertebrate host of this species is unknown but it seems likely that it may have been a bird.

Nyssorhynchus

The type species is Plasmodium dominicum.

== Phylogenetics ==
Although the evolution of this genus has been studied by a number of authors, details are still being elucidated. A brief summary of the pattern that has emerged is as follows:

The most basal split in the genus is between the reptile/bird species and the mammalian species. The bird/reptile clade appears to be related to the genera Haemoproteus, Leukocytozoon and Polychromophilus. The genus Hepatocystis appears to have evolved from with the mammalian species clade. Within the mammalian species the subgenus Laverinia appears to be basal with the subgenus Plasmodium and the rodent species being sister clades. Hepatocystis appears to have diverged after the separation of the rodent species. The species infecting lemurs may belong in the subgenus Plasmodium instead of their current placement within the subgenus Vinckeia.

Within the subgenus Plasmodium, P. vivax groups with an Asian clade which appears to be rooted in Africa. P. malaria and P. ovale both belong to an African clade and are more closely related to each other than to P. vivax. Within the subgenus Laverinia P. falciparum and P. reichenowi form a clade while the other four known species form a second clade.

There are a number of additional species in these taxa that await full description so changes to the branching order are likely. However the overall arrangement outlined above seems to be supported by a number of studies by different authors and is unlikely to change. Given the recently recognised paraphytic nature of several of the taxa above, the introduction of new genera and possibly families in the near future seems highly likely.

=== Relations with other Haemosporidian genera ===
While most phylogenetic trees have tended to agree that Plasmodium has descended from Leukocytozoon or Haemoproteus like species a Bayesian phylogenetic reconstruction suggests that Plasmodium may be the ancestral genus that has given rise to Haemoproteus and other genera. Further study in this area is required.

Another Bayesian analysis has suggested the following taxonomy: Mammalian Plasmodium and Hepatocystis are sister clades with Hepatocystis having evolved from within the genus Plasmodium; the bird and reptile species are intermixed and basal to the mammalian Plasmodium/Hepatocystis species; the reptilian/bird Plasmodium species are a sister clade to the genus Polychromophilus; Leukocytozoon and Haemoproteus and sister clades; the Leukocytozoon/Haemoproteus clade is a sister to the Parahaemoproteus clade; and the Parahaemoproteus/Haemoproteus/Leukocytozoon clade is a sister to the reptilian/bird Plasmodium/Polychromophilus clade. This grouping is supported by previous results.

A study of DNA sequences suggests that the genus is paraphytic with Hepatocystis being related to the mammalian species and Polychromophilus being related to the reptile species. This study also supports the ancestor of Plasmodium being a Leucocytozoon like species and that Plasmodium is more closely related to the Haemoproteus - specifically the subgenus Parahaemoproteus - than to Leucocytozoon.

A paper by Blanquart and Gascuel examined Plasmodium 84 mitochondrial sequences and included Hepatocystis, Haemoproteus and Leukocytozoon sequences. The results agree with the previous analyses showing that Hepatocystis, Haemoproteus and Plasmodium appear to be derived from a Leukocytozoon ancestor. Hepatocystis appears to be a sister group to the great ape-rodent clade with the lower primate clade being ancestral to all three. In terms of Plasmodium subgenera they suggest that the subgenus Plasmodium is ancestral to both Laverania and Vinckeia.

A study of parasites infecting bats found that the bats were infected by species of the genera Hepatocystis, Plasmodium, Polychomophilus and Nycteria. A phylogenetic tree which included these genera along with Haemoproteus and Leukocytozoon species was examined. As before Leukocytozoon was basal in this tree. The next clade to diverge was that of the Haemoproteus species. The remaining genera lay within the currently established genus Plasmodium. The authors suggested that the origin of the Plasmodium/Hepatocystis clade was likely to have been in Africa.

Within this genus the first to diverge were the avian and reptile species. The next clade to diverge was that of the Polychomophilus species. This was followed in branching order by the Nycteria species. The subgenus Laverinia was the next to diverge followed by the subgenus Vinckeia. The crown of the tree was formed by the subgenus Plasmodium and the genus Hepatocytis. This tree did not support the inclusion of P. ovale in the subgenus Vinckeia but agreed with previous analyses suggesting that P. malaria is more closely related to the Asian clade than P. ovale is. Several of the bat infecting Plasmodium species appear to be related to the rodent species.

Bats appear to have evolved ~66 million years ago in Africa which - assuming that the phylogenetic tree in Schaer et al is correct - places an upper limit on the date for the evolution of the mammalian species of Plasmodium.

Another study of the genera Leucocytozoon, Haemoproteus, Parahaemoproteus, Polychromophilus and Plasmodium found that Leucocytozoon occupied a basal position and that Polychromophilus and Plasmodium were sister clades.

A study of Polychromophilus species found that this genus lies within the avian/reptile clade of Plasmodium species.

The species infecting the while tail deer - Plasmodium odocoilei - was first described in 1967. A study of mitochondrial, plastid and nuclear genes of this species suggests that this species is actually two species that dierged between 2.3 million years ago and 6 million years ago. The phylogenetic tree suggests that the genus Nycteria belongs in a clade that contains the lizard and bird species, that Polychromophilus form a clade with P. odocoilei and that Hepatocystis species in bats forms a clade with the primate and rodent species. It also suggests that the closest relation to Plasmodium - other than Nycteria, Polychromophilus and Hepatocystis - is the subgenus Parahaemaproteus and that this subgenus is more closed related to Plasmodium that to the genus Haemoproteus. This study suggests that the subgenus Vinkeia is now in need of revision.

Another paper suggests the transfer of the ancestor of Plasmodium from lizards to bats without passage via birds.

A study of Nycteria suggests that Leukocytozoon is basal, followed by Heamoproteus. The sister group to Plasmodium/Nycteria/Polychromophilus/Hepatocystis is Paraheamaproteus. Hepatocystis appears to be a derived clade arising from with the subgenus Plasmodium. Polychromophilius is more closely related to the bird/lizard group than to the mammal infecting species. Nycteria is the sister taxon to the genus Plasmodium.

The genome of Haemoproteus tartakovskyi has been sequenced. Its genome (23.2 megabases) is similar in size to those of Plasmodium. Its GC-content is 25.4% which is closer to that of P. falciparum (19.3%) than to P. vivax (42.3%). Phylogenetic analyses place it as basal to Plasmodium species. Its inclusion in a phylogenetic tree suggests that the mammalian species are monophytic.

A study of 114 mitochondrial genomes from species belonging to four genera - Haemoproteus, Hepatocystis, Leucocytozoon and Plasmodium - has shown that like Plasmodium, Leucocytozoon and Haemoproteus are not monophyletic taxa. The estimated times of the divergence of these genera was after the Cretaceous-Paleogene boundary (about 66 million years ago) and coincided with the evolution of the extant avian orders.

The presence of Plasmodium dominicana and the related species Vetufebrus ovatus in Dominican amber suggests that this genus was present after the Cretaceous-Paleogene boundary (about 66 million years ago). Although Poinar has suggested a date of ~35 million years ago, the precise dating of Dominican amber is controversial so an exact date for these species cannot currently be safely assigned.

Another study found that Haemoproteus consists of two taxa and that the genus Plasmodium is paraphyletic with respect to Hepatocystis. The same study also found that Plasmodium species of mammals form a well supported clade and this clade was associated with specialization to Anopheles mosquito vectors. The Plasmodium of birds and squamate reptiles all fall within a single clade with evidence for repeated switching between birds and squamate hosts.

One study using Bayesian factors to identify the root of the phylogenetic tree has suggested that Plasmodium may be basal to Haemoproteus, Leucocytozoon, Paraheamoproteus and Polychromophilus. This tree also grouped Hepatocystis with Plasmodium.

Rayella is thought to have originated from Hepatocystis.

A study of the genera Hepatocystis, Nycteria, Plasmodium and Polychromophilus found that Polychromophilus was basal to the other genera and that Plasmodium and Hepatocystis were sister clades.

Another study has shown that Parahaemaproteus and Haemoproteus appear to be distinct genera The same study also shown that Nycteria and Hepatocystis lay within the Plasmodium clade. Plasmodium odocoilei was most closely related to genus Polychromophilus. Haemocystidium appeared to be the genus most closely related to Plasmodium.

A clade that infect ungulates has been identified. This clade includes species that infect water buffalo (Bubalus bubalis) and goats (Capra aegagrus hircus). The species infecting goats has been named Plasmodium caprae. This clade includes species that infect North American white-tailed deer (Odocoileus virginianus) and African antelopes (Cephalophus). This clade appears to be basal to the other species infecting mammals including the genus Polychromophilus.

==== Possible evolution ====
The evidence suggests the following evolutionary scenario: Plasmodium evolved from a Leucocystis like ancestor. This ancestor gave rise to the subgenus Parahaemoproteus. Both of these taxa infect birds. Plasmodium evolved from its Parahaemoproteus ancestor when it gained the ability to infect lizards. After this Plasmodium diverged into a mammal infecting clade and a bird/lizard infecting clade. Within the bird/lizard clade some species developed the ability to infect bats (Nycteria). Within the mammalian clade a number of species have also developed the ability to infect bats (Hepatocystis). Since Haemoproteus evolved after the evolution of birds this would suggest that an upper limit for the evolution of this genus is approximately 66 million years ago. The Columbidae - hosts of the Haemoproteus species - evolved in South East Asia. It is possible that this also was the origin of the genus Haemoproteus.

This upper limit may be further reduced. The genus Leucocytozoon is thought to have evolved in the Oligocene. This would place an upper limit of 33.9 million years ago for the evolution of the genus Leucocytozoon. This is in agreement with an estimate of the time of the basal radiation of the genus Plasmodium. This date of origin lies within the range of other estimates suggesting that it is plausible. This suggestion is supported by other analyses.

=== Relations with non Haemosporidian genera ===
The Piroplasma are usually considered to be the closest relations to the Haemosporidians. Based on the evolution of their vectors (ticks) they may have evolved ~300 million years ago. The vectors of Babesia and Theileria - ticks - evolved 350 million years ago ± 23 million years ago. The hard (Ixodidae) and soft bodied (Argasidae) ticks diverged 290 million years ago± 23 million years ago. The most likely place of origin of the ticks is Northern Gondwana and most probably within the region that now constitutes Eastern Africa.

A molecular Bayesian study of Babesia and Theileria species along with Plasmodium species suggests that Babesia and Theileria are sister clades and that they diverged from Plasmodium ~56.5 million years ago (95% credible interval: 86.9 million years ago - 28.2 million years ago) The dating in this study used a date of 12.5 million years ago for the origin of the genus Plasmodium. The authors also estimated that Theileria evolved 23.38 million years ago (95% credible interval 11.1 million years ago – 36.7 million years ago) and that Babesia evolved 25.7 million years ago (95% credible interval 12.8 million years ago–40.7 million years ago)

Another analysis suggests that Babesia and Theileria are more closely related to the adeleid species than to Plasmodium.

An examination of sequences from Babesiidae, Cryptosporiidae, Eimeriidae, Plasmodiidae, Sarcocystiidae, Theileriidae, a Perkinsus species and 2 dinoflagellates suggests that Plasmodium and Cryptosporidium are sister taxa and that Hepatozoon is basal to them.

Morrison has shown using molecular data that the Haemosporidia are nested within the gregarines and that this clade is distinct from the piroplasms. This latter clade is a sister group of the coccidians.

Examination of the actin genes suggests that Plasmodium is more closely related to the coccidians than to the Babesia/Theileria clade. It also suggests that Cryptosporium is basal in the Apicomplexa: this latter finding is consistent with other analyses.

=== Phylogenetic trees ===
A number of useful phylogenetic trees of this genus have been published:

- Tree of Life website
- American Museum of Natural History
- Duval, Linda; Nerrienet, Eric; Rousset, Dominique; Sadeuh Mba, Serge Alain; Houze, Sandrine; Fourment, Mathieu; Le Bras, Jacques; Robert, Vincent; Ariey, Frederic (2009). "Chimpanzee Malaria Parasites Related to Plasmodium ovale in Africa". PLOS ONE. 4 (5) e5520. Bibcode:2009PLoSO...4.5520D. doi:10.1371/journal.pone.0005520. PMC 2677663. PMID 19436742.
- Seethamchai, S; Putaporntip, C; Malaivijitnond, S; Cui, L; Jongwutiwes, S (2008). "Malaria and Hepatocystis species in wild macaques, southern Thailand". The American Journal of Tropical Medicine and Hygiene. 78 (4): 646–53. doi:10.4269/ajtmh.2008.78.646. PMID 18385364.
- Duval, Linda; Robert, Vincent; Csorba, Gabor; Hassanin, Alexandre; Randrianarivelojosia, Milijaona; Walston, Joe; Nhim, Thy; Goodman, Steve M; Ariey, Frédéric (2007). "Multiple host-switching of Haemosporidia parasites in bats". Malaria Journal. 6 157. doi:10.1186/1475-2875-6-157. PMC 2212651. PMID 18045505.
- Lee, Kim-Sung; Divis, Paul C. S; Zakaria, Siti Khatijah; Matusop, Asmad; Julin, Roynston A; Conway, David J; Cox-Singh, Janet; Singh, Balbir (2011). "Plasmodium knowlesi: Reservoir Hosts and Tracking the Emergence in Humans and Macaques". PLOS Pathogens. 7 (4) e1002015. doi:10.1371/journal.ppat.1002015. PMC 3072369. PMID 21490952.
- Hayakawa, T; Culleton, R; Otani, H; Horii, T; Tanabe, K (2008). "Big Bang in the Evolution of Extant Malaria Parasites". Molecular Biology and Evolution. 25 (10): 2233–9. doi:10.1093/molbev/msn171. PMID 18687771.

From these trees it is clear that:

- The trees are consistent with the origin of Plasmodium from Leukocytozoon
- The genus Hepatocystis is nested within (paraphytic with) the genus Plasmodium and appears to lie within the primate-rodent clade
- The rodent and primate groups are relatively closely related
- The primate (subgenus Plasmodium) and rodent species (subgenus Vinckeia) form distinct groups
- P. falciparum and P. reichenowi (subgenus Laverania) branched off early in the evolution of this genus
- The 'African' (P. malaria and P. ovale) and 'Asian' (P.cynomogli, P. semiovale and P. simium) species tend to cluster together into separate clades. P. gonderi - a species isolated in Africa - groups with the Asian clade.
- P. vivax clusters with the 'Asian' species.
- The rodent species (P. bergei, P. chabaudi and P. yoelli) form a separate clade.
- The species infecting humans do not form a single clade.
- The genus Haemoproteus appears to lie within the bird-lizard clade
- The lizard and bird species are intermingled
- Although Plasmodium gallinaceum (subgenus Haemamoeba) and Plasmodium elongatum (subgenus Huffia) appear be related here so few bird species (three) have been included, this tree may not accurately reflect their real relationship.
- The bird species (P. juxtanucleare, P. gallinaceum and P. relictum) form a clade that is related to the included Leukocytozoon and Haemoproteus species.
- While no snake parasites have been included these are likely to group with the lizard-bird division
- Hepatocystis seems to lie within Plasmodium and may be related to the primate clade

The bird and lizard species are intermixed as previously found.

An analysis of the rodent genera (Plasmodium berghei, Plasmodium chabaudi, Plasmodium vinckei and Plasmodium yoelii) suggests that these species may actually be species complexes. The separation of P. chabaudi and P. vinckei has been estimated to be between 3 million years ago and 13 million years ago while that of P. berghei and P. yoelii has been placed at 1 million years ago and 6 million years ago.

A paper that included five unnamed lemur species suggested that P. ovale is more closely related to the lemur species than to the other primate ones. It also suggested that the lemur/P. ovale clade is a sister clade of the rodent species. While this is consistent with the placement of the lemur and rodent species in the subgenus Vinckeia it is inconsistent with the current placement of P. ovale within the subgenus Plasmodium. This paper also supports a basal divergence within the mammalian species into the subgenus Laverinia and the others. The subgenera Plasmodium and Vinckeia with the exception of P. ovale appear to be sister clades.

Analysis of the apicoplast genes auggests that P. ovale is related to the rodent species. This is consistent with its relationship with the lemur species in the subgenus Vinckeia.

=== Other analyses ===
Examination of the protease gene (SERA) in 18 species has shown that the ancestral state had only a single gene and that gene duplications have occurred in the extant species. This paper confirms the groupings found elsewhere with an Asian clade. The rodent species seem to be more closely related to the Laverania subgenus than does the subgenus Plasmodium.

A deletion mutation of ~100 base pairs including part of the LS1 rRNA gene is found in the sequences of two African species - P. gonderi and an undescribed parasite taken from a mandrill - and 2 Asian species - P. cynomolgi and P. simiovale. This mutation was not found in the other species examined (Leucocytozoon caulleryi, Leucocytozoon sabrazesi, P. bergei, P. chabaudi, P. falciparum, P. floridense, P. gallacium, P. fragile, P. juxtanucleare, P. knowelsi, P. mexicanum, P. reichenowi, P. relictum, P. simiae, P. vivax, P. yoelii and two unnamed Haemoproteus species.) These mutations are rare events and strongly suggests these species are related.

Another paper suggests that after the mammalian-reptile/bird species split that the subgenus Laverina is basal among the mammal species. This study did not include mammalian infecting species other than primate and rodent species and for this reason Laverina may not be as basal as the study suggests. The remaining branching order is consistent with other analyses placing the rodent species as the first branch after the P. falciparum/P. reichenowi clade. It places P. malaria and P. ovale as being more closely related to each other than to P. vivax. This is consistent with the proposed Asian origin of P. vivax.

Although bird malaria species use a variety of mosquito vectors from the genera Aedes, Anopheles, Culex, Culiseta, Mansonia and Psorophora, all mammalian species use vectors only from the genus Anopheles. This host switch seems to have been associated with a specialization with a particular genus of mosquito.

The ability to store haemozoin appears to have evolved only once in the common ancestor of Haemoproteus, Hepatocystis and Plasmodium.

A study of the relationships between Haemocystis, Haemoproteus, Leucocytozoon and Plasmodium suggests that (1) Leucocytozoon is basal (2) Haemoproteus is a sister clade to the remainder (3) Parahaemoproteus is a sister to Plasmodium and (4) Haemocystis is nested within Plasmodium. As before the bird/lizard species form a distinct clade.

In birds the Haemoproteus and Leucocytozoon species rarely change transmission area. These parasites are restricted to one resident bird fauna over a long evolutionary time span and are not freely spread between the continents with the help of migratory birds. Lineages of the genus Plasmodium in contrast seem more freely spread between the continents. This suggests that the origin on the genus Plasmodium may have coincided with the ability to transfer between avian hosts more easily than the other genera.

An analysis of a large number of genera suggested that the taxonomy may need revision. Leucocytozoon appears to be basal to most of the Haemosporidia. The genera Heamoproteus and Parahaemaproteus are the next most basal clade. At least one species in the genus Heamoproteus grouped with the main Plasmodium clade. Within the Plasmodium clade lay the genera Hepatocystis, Nycteria and Polychromophilus. Plasmodium odocoiliei appeared to be very divergent in the clade. Within the palsmodium clade the reptile species formed one grouping while the subgenera Laverinia, Plasmodium and Vinkeia also formed subgroupings. These results if confirmed suggest that the taxonomy of the group will need substantial revision.

=== Molecular clock estimates ===
All dates estimated so far using a molecular clock should probably be regarded with some suspicion given the existing disagreements between the various authors.

The branching order suggested by other analyses concurs with an analysis of the mitochondrial genes This latter paper puts the divergence between the reptile-bird and mammal clades at 38.4 million years ago ± 3.2 million years ago (Mya). Other divergence times reported include

- P. falciparum – P. reichenowi - 4 million years ago (±0.9 million years)
- P. ovale - P. cynomolgi/P. gonderi/P. simiovale/P. fieldi/P. inui/P. fragile/P. coatneyi/P. knowlesi - 19 million years ago
- P. malariae and P. inui/P. hylobati - 19 million years ago
- P. malariae/P. inui/P. hylobati - P. chabaudi/P. yoelii - 25.7 million years ago (±2.6 million years)
- P. knowlesi - P. cynomolgi/P. simiovale/P. fieldi/P. inui/P. fragile/P. coatneyi - 6.3 million years ago (±1.4 million years)

An estimate of the dates of evolution of several species using the date of separation of the African species P. gonderi and the Asian clade at 10 million years ago gives estimates as follows:

- P. falciparum - P. reichenowi: 5 million years ago
- P ovale - P. malariae: 14 million years ago
- P. inui - P. hylobati: 3 million years ago
- P. cynomogli - P. simium/P. vivax: 5 million years ago
- P. fragile - P. cynomogli/P. simium/P. vivax/P. inui/P. hylobati: 6 million years ago
- P ovale/P. malariae - P. fragile/P. cynomogli/P. simium/P. vivax/P. inui/P. hylobati: 18 million years ago

Analysis of 45 single copy nuclear genes from eight species (P. berghei, P. chabaudi, P. falciparum, P. gallinaceum, P. knowlesi, P. reichenowi, P. vivax, P. yoelii) using several different phylogenetic methods suggest a divergence date between Theileria and Plasmodium between 294 million years ago and 314 million years ago. Estimates of the mutation rates suggest a date of divergence between P. falciparum and P. reichenowi between 5 million years ago and 7 million years ago.

The estimated date of divergence between P. vivax and P. knowlesi was between 15 million years ago and 46 million years ago. This latter period coincides with the radiation of the Old World monkeys which these parasites infect. The date of divergences between P. berghei, P. chabaudi and P. yoelii was estimated to be between 34 million years ago and 25 million years ago. The main radiation of the rodent family Muridae occurred ~24 million years ago.

A paper based on the analysis of 22 nuclear genes suggests a radiation of malarial parasites within the Oligocene (34-23 million years ago).

Another paper examining the dates of evolution using the concatenated sequences of the cytochrome c oxidase III, cytochrome c oxidase I and cytochrome b genes - all from the mitochondrion - suggested the following dates for the evolution of the species examined (P. coatneyi, P. cynomolgi, P. falciparum, P. fieldi, P. fragile, P. gonderi, P. hylobati, P. inui, P. knowlesi, P. malariae, P. ovale, P. reichenowi, P. simiovale, P. vivax) was as follows:

Asian-African primate clade divergence: 12 million years ago-19 million years ago

Primate-rodent clade divergence: 15 million years ago-30 million years ago

Reptile/bird-mammal clade divergence: 20 million years ago-30 million years ago

An estimation of the date of evolution of this genus based upon the mutation rate in the cytochrome b gene places the evolution of P. falciparum at 2.5 million years ago. The authors also estimated that the mammalian species of this genus evolved 12.8 million years ago and that the order Haemosporida evolved 16.2 million years ago. While the date of evolution of P. falciparum is consistent with alternative methods, the other two dates are considerably more recent than other published estimates and probably should be treated with caution.

Another paper which examined primate, rodent, lemur, bird and reptile species suggests that the genus originated between 30 million years ago and 50 million years ago. The split between the reptile/bird and mammalian species occurred between 31.4 million years ago and 47.6 million years ago. The first division in the mammalian species was between Laverinia and the others species. The separation of P. falciparum and P. reichenowi was estimated to be between 3.6 million years ago and 7.9 million years ago. The bonobo strains of P. falciparum of were the closest relations to those of humans. This analysis grouped P. ovale with the lemur species and this clade as a sister clade to the rodent species. While this is consistent with the current placement of the lemur species with the rodent species in the subgenus Vinckeia, it is inconsistent with the current placement of P. ovale in the subgenus Plasmodium. The date of separation of P. ovale from the lemur species was estimated to be 25 million years ago and 35 million years ago and their date of divergence from the rodent species was dated to between 30 million years ago and 50 million years ago. The rodent species first diverged between 10 million years ago and 20 million years ago. P. atherui appears to be more closely related to the P. berghei/P. yoelli clade than to P. chabaudi. P. malariae evolved between 20 million years ago and 30 million years ago and is more closely related to P. vivax than to P. ovale. P vivax and P. cynomogli last shared an ancestor between 2.2 million years ago and 4.5 million years ago. The origin of the Asian clade was placed between 5 million years ago and 8.2 million years ago.

Another estimate of the dates of evolution has proposed that the mammalian Plasmodium parasites originated over 64 million years ago and that split between P. falciparum and P. reichenowi occurred 3.0-5.5 million years ago. These authors suggested that the split between P. vivax and P knowlesi occurred 18 million years ago-34 million years ago million years ago. This paper also suggested that the genus Plasmodium evolved between 64 million years ago and 120 million years ago.

Another study has placed the evolution of the subgenus Laverina between 3.09 million years ago and 22.93 million years ago. The same paper estimated the P. billbrayi - P.gaboni split between 1.92 million years ago and 4.69 million years ago and the P. reichenowi - P. falciparum between 4.02 million years ago and 7.84 million years ago.

Bats evolved between 51.5 million years ago and 75.3 million years ago. Since it appears that the mammalian infecting Plasmodium species evolved from a bat infecting species, this estimate may provide an upper limit for the date of evolution of these species of Plasmodium. A larger study suggests that bats evolved 58.9 million years ago. This upper limit for the date of bat infecting parasites is consistent with the estimates of the dates of evolution of the mammalian infecting Plasmodium species.

The divergence of Old World monkeys and apes has been dated to 25 million years ago to 30 million years ago. Since the subgenus Laverinia infects apes rather than monkeys, this date suggests an upper limit for the evolution of this subgenus. This date also places an upper limit on the date when the species infecting Old World monkeys evolved.

A Bayesian estimate has suggested that the genus Plasmodium evolved about 35 million years ago. The authors also found that the lemur clade evolved about 20 million years ago, the rodent species about 12 million years ago, the two known ovale species about 25 million years ago and the Asian species about 8 million years ago. The subgenus Laverinia evolved about 18 million years ago.

The branching order in this subgenus suggests that P. billbrayi and P. gaboni are sister species and form an early diverging clade. P. falciparum and P. reichenowi are sister species and they are related to P. billcolinsi.

A Bayesian estimate of the date of the most recent common ancestor of the rodent species put this between 4.5 million years ago and 17.9 million years ago.

An estimate based on the genome sequences of Plasmodium gallinaceum and Plasmodium relictum and the previously sequenced mammalian parasite genomes has suggested a divergence date of 10 million years ago. This estimate was based on a separation date of 1 million years for the two ovale species. The dates seem to be at odds with other estimates. This may be because the date of separation of the ovale species currently has considerable variance: the 95% confidence interval in one paper was 0.5 – 7.7 Mya.

=== Laverania ===
Four species (P. billbrayi, P. billcollinsi, P. falciparum and P. reichenowi) form a clade within the subgenus Lavernia. This subgenus is more closely related to the other primate species than to the bird species or the included Leuocytozoon species. Both P. billbrayi and P. billcollinsi infect both the chimpanzee subspecies included in this study (Pan troglodytes troglodytes and Pan troglodytes schweinfurthii). P. falciparum infects the bonobo (Pan paniscus) and P. reichenowi infects only one subspecies (Pan troglodytes troglodytes). Caution has been raised about the adequacy of the description of these new species.

A report of a new species that clusters with P. falciparum and P. reichenowi in chimpanzees has been published, although to date the species has been identified only from the sequence of its mitochondrion. Further work will be needed to describe this new species, however, it appears to have diverged from the P. falciparum- P. reichenowi clade about 21 million years ago. A second report has confirmed the existence of this species in chimpanzees. This report has also shown that P. falciparum is not a uniquely human parasite as had been previously believed. A third report on the epidemiology of P. falciparum has been published. This study investigated two mitochondrial genes (cytB and cox1), one plastid gene (tufA), and one nuclear gene (ldh) in 12 chimpanzees and two gorillas from Cameroon and one lemur from Madagascar. Plasmodium falciparum was found in one gorilla and two chimpanzee samples. Two chimpanzee samples tested positive for Plasmodium ovale and one for Plasmodium malariae. Additionally one chimpanzee sample showed the presence of P. reichenowi and another P. gaboni. A new species - Plasmodium malagasi - was provisionally identified in the lemur. This species seems likely to belong to the Vinckeia subgenus but further work is required.

A study of ~3000 wild ape specimens collected from Central Africa has shown that Plasmodium infection is common and is usually with multiple species. The ape species included in the study were western gorillas (Gorilla gorilla), eastern gorillas (Gorilla beringei), bonobos (Pan paniscus) and chimpanzees (Pan troglodytes). 99% of the strains fell into six species within the subgenus Laverina. P. falciparum formed a monophyletic lineage within the gorilla parasite radiation suggesting an origin in gorillas rather than chimpanzees.

It has been shown that P. falciparum forms a clade with the species P. reichenowi. This clade may have originated between 3 million years ago and 10000 years ago. It is proposed that the origin of P. falciparum may have occurred when its precursors developed the ability to bind to sialic acid Neu5Ac possibly via erythrocyte binding protein 175. Humans lost the ability to make the sialic acid Neu5Gc from its precursor Neu5Ac several million years ago and this may have protected them against infection with P. reichenowi.

Another paper has suggested that the P. falciparum isolates found in apes are derived from humans and that P. falciparum and P. reichenowi diverged when humans and chimpanzees/gorillas did (between 5 million years ago and 7 million years ago).

It is considered that P. falciparum in humans originated from a single transmission event and that the great apes do not represent a potential reservoir for on going transmission.

The origin of P. falciparum in humans seems likely to have been from bonobos rather than gorillas or chimpanzees.

Another estimate of the most recent common ancestor of the extant strains that has been published is 452,000 years ago.

A review of this subgenus has been published Based on the analysis of the cytochrome b gene the relationships in this subgenus appear to as follows: P. falciparum and P. reichenowi are sister species. Their closest relation is P. billcollinsi. P. gaboni and P. billbrayi are sister species whose closest relation is P. gora. P. gorb is more closely related to the P. falciparum/reichenowi/billcollinsi clade than the P. gaboni/billbrayi/gora clade. This putative taxonomy will need confirmation from other DNA studies. A second study seems to confirm this proposed grouping.

Another estimate puts the divergence between falciparum and reichenowi at ~200,000 years before present.

The dates of the evolution of the species within the subgenus Laverania have been estimated as follows:

- Laverania: 12 million years ago (Mya) (95% estimated range: 6 million years ago - 19 million years ago)
- P. falciparum in humans: 0.2 million years ago (range: 0.078 million years ago - 0.33 million years ago)
- P. falciparum in Pan paniscus: 0.77 million years ago (range: 0.43 million years ago - 1.6 million years ago)
- P. falciparum in humans and Pan paniscus: 0.85 million years ago (0.46 million years ago - 1.3 million years ago)
- P. reichenowi - P. falciparum in Pan paniscus: 2.2 million years ago (range: 0.41 million years ago - 3.1 million years ago)
- P. reichenowi - 1.8 million years ago (range: 0.6 million years ago - 3.2 million years ago)
- P. billbrayi - P. falciparum 1.1 million years ago (range: 0.52 million years ago - 1.7 million years ago)
- P. billcollinsi - 0.97 million years ago (range: 0.38 million years ago - 1.7 million years ago)
- P. praefalciparum - P. falciparum in gorilas 40,000-60,000 years ago

Another estimate using the mutation rate (1.2 × 10^{−8} subsititutions/site/year) of the cytochrome b gene placed the spread of P. falciparum to humans at 365,000 years ago (95% credible interval: 112,000 to 1,036,000 years).

Revised names have been proposed for the P. gora and P. gorb species - Plasmodium blacklocki and Plasmodium adleri respectively. These names were chosen to honour the malariologists Saul Adler (1895–1966) and Donald Blacklock (1879–1953). It has also been proposed that the P. falciparum strains infecting gorillas should be renamed Plasmodium praefalciparum. This proposal appears to have been accepted. The species P. billbrayi seems to be synonymous with earlier named P. gaboni.

Host-parasite relations:

- P. falciparum has been isolated from chimpanzees, gorillas and humans. The non human strains may be reclassified as P. praefalciparum.
- P. reichenowi has been isolated from chimpanzees.
- P. billcollinsi has been isolated from chimpanzees.
- P. billbrayi has been isolated from chimpanzees.
- P. gaboni has been isolated from chimpanzees.
- P. adleri has been isolated from gorillas.
- P. blacklocki has been isolated from gorillas.
- P. lomamiensis has been isolated from bonobos.
- P. praefalciparum has been isolated from gorillas.

Another analysis has proposed the following arrangement of species: P. billcollinsi, P. gaboni and P. reichenowi only infect chimpanzees while P. adleri, P. blacklocki and P. praefalciparum only infect gorillas. P. praefalciparum appears to be the closest relation to P. falciparum.

A review of the genomes of all the known species in this subgenus found that the divergence between P. falciparum and P. praefalciparum occurred between 40,000 and 60,000 years ago. The expansion of P. falciparum encountered a bottle neck between 4,000 and 6,000 years ago.

It appears that P. falciparum has been introduced into South America on several occasions. The extant strains fall into two clades - one northern and one southern. The most probable origin of these strains is Africa and it seems that they were introduced with the slave trade.

Analysis of 45 single copy nuclear genes from eight species (P. berghei, P. chabaudi, P. falciparum, P. gallinaceum, P. knowlesi, P. reichenowi, P. vivax, P. yoelii) using several different phylogenetic methods suggest a divergence data between 294 and 314 between Theileria and Plasmodium. Estimates of the mutation rates suggest a date of divergence between P. falciparum and P. reichenowi between 5 million years ago and 7 million years ago.

Analysis of polymorphisms in the mitochondrial genes suggests a sub Saharan origin for P. falciparum with separate colonisations of Southeast Asia and Oceania. Given the distributions of the other members of Laverinia it seems likely all the known members of this subgenus originated in Africa.

Another species - Plasmodium lomamiensis - has been described from bonobos. The name is derived from the Lomami National Park where the parasite was first identified. The relationship of this species to others in the subgenus has yet to be clarified.

Another study has shown that the ancestor of P. falciparum was the gorilla parasite P. praefalciparum. This species first infected humans between 40,000-60,000 years ago and then underwent a population bottleneck 4,000-6,000 years ago. The common ancestor of this subgenus existed between 0.7 million years ago and 1.2 million years ago. At this time a division occurred into clade A (P. adleri and P. gaboni) and clade B - the other species in the subgenus. Within clade B, P. blacklocki diverged about 960,000 years ago and P. billcollinsi about 500,000 years ago. Within clade A, P. adleri and P. gaboni diverged about 140–230 thousand years ago. P. reichenowi and the ancestor of P. praefalciparum/P. falciparum also diverged about the same time. The P. falciparum population reached a nadir about 5,000 years ago (N_{e} ~3000).

=== Plasmodium ===
Colobine and macaque monkeys migrated from Africa into the Eurasian continent 10 and 6 millions of years ago respectively and became the ancestors of the extant Asian Old World monkey species. Asian Old World monkey malaria parasite species infect both colobine and macaque monkeys. The existing divergence between the Asian and African clade of this subgenus seems likely to have been caused by intercontinental allopatric speciation along with that of their hosts.

Malaria parasites of the lemurs are not traditionally grouped with the subgenus Plasmodium being placed rather within subgenus Vinckeia. This classification may not be correct. Based on an analysis of the mitochondria, these parasites seem to group with the others infecting primates. The origin of the primate infecting species (excluding those in the Laverina subgenus) may date back to the Eocene - a time when the primate radiation began. This analysis also suggests that the species infecting gorillas and humans may have originated in chimps.

=== Plasmodium: Asian clade ===
At least nine species belong to the 'Asian' clade of Plasmodium. These species include Plasmodium coatneyi, Plasmodium cynomolgi, Plasmodium fieldi, Plasmodium fragile, Plasmodium inui, Plasmodium hylobati, Plasmodium simiovale, Plasmodium simium and Plasmodium vivax.

As a rule (with the noticeable exception of P. knowesli), the Asian species have a 72-hour intra erythroctytic life cycle.

Analysis of the merozoite surface protein in ten species of the Asian clade suggest that this group diversified between 3 and 6.3 million years ago - a period that coincided with the radiation of the macques within South East Asia. The inferred branching order differs from that found from the analysis of other genes suggesting that this phylogenetic tree may be difficult to resolve. Positive selection on this gene was also found.

In an analysis of the SSU rRNA gene it was found that all Asian simian Plasmodium species have a single S-type-like gene and several A-type-like genes. A 50 residue insertion in the V7 variable region near the stem 43 is shared exclusively by the S-type like sequences of the Asian simian Plasmodium species and the S- and O-type sequences of P. vivax. This is consistent with their shared ancestry.

Plasmodium vivax may have originated in Asia and the related species Plasmodium simium appears to be derived through a transfer from the human P. vivax to New World monkey species in South America. This was proposed in a study of howler monkeys near São Paulo, Brazil.

Another paper has suggested an African origin for P. vivax.

Another paper reported the presence of P. vivax in gorillas and chimpanzees. The DNA sequences analysed fell into two clades. One clade included all the human strains: the second clade seems likely to be an undescribed species. The gorilla and chimpanzee strains did not group by species suggesting that P. vivax transmission occurs between these species. The authors suggested an Africa origin for P. vivax.

A paper has suggested that P. vivax has an African origin and underwent a severe bottleneck and then expanded rapidly once it left Africa.

An African origin for P. vivax would explain the presence of P. gonderi - an Africa species - within this clade.

Plasmodium species have been isolated from orangutans. These isolates appear to belong to the Asian clade and share an ancestor with Plasmodium inui and Plasmodium hylobati.

A paper has suggested that P. vivax is basal to the Asian clade branching after P. gonderi. This is consistent with an African origin of the Asian clade.

A study of worldwide isolates of P. vivax found the maximum diversity to lie within South East Asia, suggesting this as the origin of this species. The same paper found that isolates in the Americas fell into two groups suggesting that there were at least 2 separate introductions of this parasite into the Americas.

Time to most recent common ancestor

P. vivax appears to have evolved between 45,000 and 82,000 years ago from a species that infects south east Asian macques. This is consistent with the other evidence of a south eastern origin of this species. A second estimate put the earliest date of the evolution of P. vivax at 265,000 years.

An estimate of the date of origin of P. vivax has placed it at 768,000 years ago.

An estimate of the time of origin of P. vivax based on nuclear genes suggests that it originated between 232,228 and 303,030 years ago. It may have appeared in India between 79,235 and 104,008 years ago.

A study of P. vivax in the Americas suggests that the strains in Venezuela and northeastern Brazil diverged from the others ~30,000 years ago. This separation may have occurred before the parasite was introduced into South America.

The most recent common ancestor of the extant P. knowlesi strains has been estimated to have appeared 257,000 (95% credibility interval 98,000–478,000) years ago. P. knowlesi underwent a rapid population growth between approximately 30,000 and 40,000 years ago. This era follows the growth in the human population in this area (~50,000 years ago).

Branching order

P. coatneyi and P. inui appear to be closely related to P. vivax.

P. vivax and P. knowesli appear to have diverged 25–30 million years ago.

P. gonderi appears to be basal in this clade. This is consistent with its African distribution rather than the mainly Asian distribution of the other species in this group.

Several of the 'Asian' clade - Plasmodium coatneyi, Plasmodium cynomolgi, Plasmodium fragile, Plasmodium inui, Plasmodium fieldi, Plasmodium hylobati, Plasmodium inui, Plasmodium knowlesi and Plasmodium simiovale and an African species Plasmodium gonderi - have a single S-type-like gene and several A-type-like genes. It seems likely that these species form a clade within the subgenus Plasmodium.

The 'Asian' species form a clade with P. simium and P. vivax being clearly closely related as are P. knowseli and P. coatneyi and P. fragile; similarly P. brazillium and P. malariae are related. P. hylobati and P. inui are closely related. P. fragile and P. gonderi appear to be more closely related to P. vivax than to P. malariae.

An analysis of four apicoplast genome-encoded genes (small subunit rRNA, large subunit rRNA and caseinolytic protease C) of nine 'Asian' species (P. coatneyi, P. cynomolgi, P. fieldi, P. fragile, P. hylobati, P. inui, P. knowlesi, P. simiovale and P. vivax) and the African species P. gonderi suggests that P. coatneyi and P. knowlesi are closely related and that P. fragile is the species most closely related to these two. Also P. vivax and P. cynomolgi appear to be related.

The pattern emerging from this data suggests that the ancestor of P. gonderi and the 'Asian' clade (P. coatneyi, P. cynomolgi, P. fieldi, P. fragile, P. hylobati, P. inui, P. knowlesi, P. simiovale and P. vivax) infected a primate host - perhaps the ancestor of the extant rhesus monkey - and migrated with its vertebrate host from Africa to Asia via the Middle East. The Asian branch then gave rise to several clades - P. fragile-P. coatneyi/P. knowlesi, P. hylobati/P. inui and P. cynomolgi - P. simium/P. vivax. P. fieldi, P. simiovale and P. vivax appear to be relatively early diverging species within this clade. P. fieldi and P. simiovale appear to be each other's closest relations.

A summary of the currently understood branching order is as follows:

- P. gondori - Asian clade
- P. fieldi, P. simiovale, P. vivax, P. simium, P. cynomolgi, P. inui - P. fragile, P. coatneyi, P. knowlesi, P. hylobati
- P. vivax/P. simium - P. fieldi, P. simiovale, P. cynomolgi, P. inui
- P. cynomolgi/P. inui - P. fieldi/P. simiovale
- P. fragile/P. coatneyi - P. knowlesi/P. hylobati

This branching order may have to be revised as more data becomes available. The timing of these events is still rather uncertain.

The African species P. georgesi appears to be a close relation of P. gondori.

Another paper suggests that P. coatneyi and P. knowlesi are sister species while P. hylobati and P. inui are also sister species. This analysis supports the grouping of P. fieldi and P. semiovale as sister species with their closest relation being P. cynomogli. It also agrees with previous analyses that place P. simium and P. vivax as sister species. It also agrees that P. gondori is the African species most closely related to the Asian clade.

This branching order may have some difficulties. A deletion of the LS1 rRNA gene of P. gonderi P. cynomolgi and P. simiovale has been reported. This mutation was not found in the other species of this group that were examined - P. fragile, P. knowelsi, P. simiae and P. vivax. These mutations are rare and suggest a relationship between the first three species to the exclusion of the others.

Host relations

P. cynomolgi, P. inui and P. knowlesi infect primates of the genus Presbytis.

P. cynomolgi, P. fieldi, P. inui, P. knowlesi and P. semiovale infect primates of the genus Macaca.

P. georgesi and P. gondori infect primates of the genus Cocerebus.

P. gondori infects primates of the genus Mandillus.

Additional species

Within the 'Asian' clade are three unnamed potential species. One infects each of the two chimpanzee subspecies included in the study (Pan troglodytes troglodytes and Pan troglodytes schweinfurthii). These appear to be related to the P. vivax/P. simium clade.

A new species - yet to be formally described - has been reported from orangutans (Pongo pygmaeus) in Indonesia. This species was identified from mitochondrial DNA in the blood of the hosts. It appears to be related to the other members of the Asian clade.

Another as yet unnamed species likely to belong to this group has been identified in the mandrill (Mandrillus sphinx).

=== Plasmodium: African clade ===
The species infecting Old World monkeys (subgenus Plasmodium) seem to form a clade.

P. ovale is more closely related to P. malariae than to P. vivax.

Plasmodium ovale has recently been shown to consist of two cocirculating species - Plasmodium ovale curtisi and Plasmodium ovale wallikeri. These two species can only be distinguished by genetic means and they separated between 1 million years ago and 3.5 million years ago. A second estimate has placed the separation of these species at 4.5 million years ago (95% confidence interval 0.7-7.7 Mya)

P. ovale, based on an analysis of the apicoplast genome, appears to be related to the rodent species suggesting an ancestral host switch.

The relationship between the P. ovale species and those with rodent hosts has been confirmed by sequencing the genomes of both P. ovale species.

One paper has reported a strain of malaria in a chimpanzee with a mitochondrial sequence identical to that of P. ovale and a second closely related to it. It seems likely as has been proposed earlier that P. ovale may have an animal reservoir.

Two unnamed potential species infect the bonobo (Pan paniscus) and these are related to the P. malariae/P. brazillium clade.

The species P. gonderi appears to be the closest relation to the Asian clade.

=== Plasmodium malariae ===
Plasmodium malariae has been considered to be closely related to Plasmodium brasilianum and Plasmodium rhodiani. These species may be a single species with multiple hosts. Because the number of strains that have examined to date remains small, retirement of the brasilianum and rhodiani species names to junior synonym status should probably be delayed.

=== Rodent species ===
Although the branching order among the mammalian clades has not yet been determined the branching order in the rodent infections species has been studied. The rodent parasites (P. berghei, P. chabaudi, P. vinckei and P. yoelii) seem to form a distinct clade. P. berghei and P. yoelii appear to be sister species as do P. chabaudi and P. vinckei. The separation dates between P. berghei and P. yoelii has been estimated to be 4.5 million years ago (95% credibility interval 2.5 - 6.0); that between P. chabaudi and P. vinckei has been estimated to be 9 million years ago (95% credibility interval 5.5 - 12.6); and that between the P. berghei/P. yoelii and P. chabaudi/P. vinckei clades to be 12.5 million years ago (95% credibility interval 9.0 - 17.5). These estimates are consistent with those from another paper that included a number of primate infecting species.

P. atheruri appears to be the sister species of P. vinckei.

=== Notes ===
A recently (2009) described species (Plasmodium hydrochaeri) that infects capybaras (Hydrochaeris hydrochaeris) may complicate the phylogentics of this genus. This species appears to be most similar to Plasmodium mexicanum a lizard parasite. Further work in this area seems indicated.

Unlike other eukaryotes studied to date Plasmodium species have two or three distinct SSU rRNA (18S rRNA) molecules encoded within the genome. These have been divided into types A, S and O. Type A is expressed in the asexual stages; type S in the sexual and type O only in the oocyst. Type O is only known to occur in Plasmodium vivax at present. The reason for this gene duplication is not known but presumably reflects an adaption to the different environments the parasite lives within.

It has been reported that the C terminal domain of the RNA polymerase 2 in the primate infecting species (other than P. falciparum and probably P. reichenowei) appears to be unusual suggesting that the classification of species into the subgenus Plasmodium may have an evolutionary and biological basis.

It is known from many written historical sources that P. vivax malaria was endemic in the wetlands of England from the 1500s until the 20th century. It is suspected that this disease was introduced by the Romans sometime before 400 AD. It seems likely that it remained endemic in these areas at least up to 1000 AD.

A study in Senegal of 25 strains isolated there suggests that P. falciparum underwent a major (60-fold) population expansion of ~20,000-40,000 years ago.

A population study based on isolates from several countries suggests that distinct clustering of continental populations - Africa, Southeast Asia and Oceania - has occurred. Within these grouping there has been some further clustering - West Africa versus East Africa, Thailand versus Cambodia. No distinction was identified between isolates from Mali and Burkina Faso.

== Host range ==
Because of the number of species parasited by Plasmodium further discussion has been broken down into following pages:

- Plasmodium species infecting humans and other primates
- Plasmodium species infecting mammals other than primates
- Plasmodium species infecting birds
- Plasmodium species infecting reptiles

== Criteria used for speciation ==
The vertebrate host is the first criterion used for speciation and may be sufficient alone to determine the subgenus as in Ophidiella and Vinckeia. The morphological features of the parasite itself most commonly used to describe a species include the number of pigment granules, the degree of encirclement of the host nucleus, the size of the parasite, the degree of host nucleus displacement and the degree of host cell enlargement.

== List of species ==
- Plasmodium accipiteris
- Plasmodium achiotense
- Plasmodium achromaticum
- Plasmodium acuminatum
- Plasmodium adleri
- Plasmodium aegyptensis
- Plasmodium aeuminatum
- Plasmodium agamae
- Plasmodium alaudae
- Plasmodium alloelongatum
- Plasmodium anasum
- Plasmodium anomaluri
- Plasmodium arachniformis
- Plasmodium ashfordi
- Plasmodium atheruri
- Plasmodium audaciosum
- Plasmodium auffenbergi
- Plasmodium aurulentum
- Plasmodium australis
- Plasmodium attenuatum
- Plasmodium azurophilum
- Plasmodium billbrayi
- Plasmodium billcollinsi
- Plasmodium balli
- Plasmodium bambusicolai
- Plasmodium basilisci
- Plasmodium beaucournui
- Plasmodium beebei
- Plasmodium beltrani
- Plasmodium berghei
- Plasmodium bertii
- Plasmodium bigueti
- Plasmodium bioccai
- Plasmodium biziurae
- Plasmodium blacklocki
- Plasmodium booliati
- Plasmodium bouillize
- Plasmodium brodeni
- Plasmodium brasilianum
- Plasmodium brumpti
- Plasmodium brygooi
- Plasmodium bubalis
- Plasmodium bucki
- Plasmodium buteonis
- Plasmodium caloti
- Plasmodium capistrani
- Plasmodium caprae
- Plasmodium carmelinoi
- Plasmodium carteri
- Plasmodium cathemerium
- Plasmodium caucasica
- Plasmodium cephalophi
- Plasmodium cercopitheci
- Plasmodium chabaudi
- Plasmodium chiricahuae
- Plasmodium circularis
- Plasmodium circumflexum
- Plasmodium clelandi
- Plasmodium cnemaspi
- Plasmodium cnemidophori
- Plasmodium coatneyi
- Plasmodium coggeshalli
- Plasmodium coluzzii
- Plasmodium colombiense
- Plasmodium columbae
- Plasmodium cordyli
- Plasmodium coturnixi
- Plasmodium coulangesi
- Plasmodium cuculus
- Plasmodium cyclopsi
- Plasmodium cynomolgi bastianelli
- Plasmodium cynomolgi ceylonensis
- Plasmodium cynomolgi cynomolgi
- Plasmodium delichoni
- Plasmodium dherteae
- Plasmodium diminutivum
- Plasmodium diploglossi
- Plasmodium dissanaikei
- Plasmodium dominicana
- Plasmodium dorsti
- Plasmodium draconis
- Plasmodium durae
- Plasmodium egerniae
- Plasmodium elongatum
- Plasmodium eylesi
- Plasmodium fairchildi
- Plasmodium falciparum
- Plasmodium fallax
- Plasmodium fieldi
- Plasmodium fischeri
- Plasmodium foleyi
- Plasmodium formosanum
- Plasmodium forresteri
- Plasmodium floridense
- Plasmodium fragile
- Plasmodium gaboni
- Plasmodium gabaldoni
- Plasmodium garnhami
- Plasmodium gallinaceum
- Plasmodium gemini
- Plasmodium georgesi
- Plasmodium ghadiriani
- Plasmodium giganteum
- Plasmodium giovannolai
- Plasmodium ginsburgi
- Plasmodium girardi
- Plasmodium globularis
- Plasmodium gloriai
- Plasmodium gologoense
- Plasmodium golvani
- Plasmodium gonatodi
- Plasmodium gonderi
- Plasmodium gracilis
- Plasmodium griffithsi
- Plasmodium guangdong
- Plasmodium gundersi
- Plasmodium guyannense
- Plasmodium heischi
- Plasmodium hegneri
- Plasmodium hermani
- Plasmodium heroni
- Plasmodium heteronucleare
- Plasmodium hexamerium
- Plasmodium hispaniolae
- Plasmodium hoionucleophilum
- Plasmodium holaspi
- Plasmodium holti
- Plasmodium homocircumflexum
- Plasmodium homopolare
- Plasmodium huffi
- Plasmodium hydrochaeri
- Plasmodium hylobati
- Plasmodium incertae
- Plasmodium icipeensis
- Plasmodium iguanae
- Plasmodium inopinatum
- Plasmodium intabazwe
- Plasmodium inui
- Plasmodium japonicum
- Plasmodium jeanriouxi
- Plasmodium jefferyi
- Plasmodium jiangi
- Plasmodium josephinae
- Plasmodium joyeuxi
- Plasmodium juxtanucleare
- Plasmodium kachelibaensis
- Plasmodium kadogoi
- Plasmodium kaninii
- Plasmodium kempi
- Plasmodium kentropyxi
- Plasmodium knowlesi knowlesi
- Plasmodium knowlesi edesoni
- Plasmodium koreafense
- Plasmodium kyaii
- Plasmodium lacertiliae
- Plasmodium lagopi
- Plasmodium lainsoni
- Plasmodium landauae
- Plasmodium lemuris
- Plasmodium leucocytica
- Plasmodium lenoblei
- Plasmodium lepidoptiformis
- Plasmodium lionatum
- Plasmodium lomamiensis
- Plasmodium lophurae
- Plasmodium loveridgei
- Plasmodium lucens
- Plasmodium lutzi
- Plasmodium lygosomae
- Plasmodium mabuiae
- Plasmodium mackerrasae
- Plasmodium mackiei
- Plasmodium maculilabre
- Plasmodium maior
- Plasmodium majus
- Plasmodium malagasi
- Plasmodium malariae
- Plasmodium multivacuolaris
- Plasmodium marginatum
- Plasmodium matutinum
- Plasmodium megaglobularis
- Plasmodium megalotrypa
- Plasmodium melanoleuca
- Plasmodium melanipherum
- Plasmodium merulae
- Plasmodium mexicanum
- Plasmodium michikoa
- Plasmodium minasense
- Plasmodium minuoviride
- Plasmodium modestum
- Plasmodium mohammedi
- Plasmodium morulum
- Plasmodium multiformis
- Plasmodium narayani
- Plasmodium necatrix
- Plasmodium neusticuri
- Plasmodium nucleophilium
- Plasmodium octamerium
- Plasmodium odhiamboi
- Plasmodium odocoilei
- Plasmodium ovale curtisi
- Plasmodium ovale wallikeri
- Plasmodium pachysomum
- Plasmodium paddae
- Plasmodium papernai
- Plasmodium parahexamerium
- Plasmodium paranucleophilum
- Plasmodium parvulum
- Plasmodium pedioecetii
- Plasmodium pelaezi
- Plasmodium percygarnhami
- Plasmodium pessoai
- Plasmodium petersi
- Plasmodium pifanoi
- Plasmodium pinotti
- Plasmodium pitheci
- Plasmodium pitmani
- Plasmodium polare
- Plasmodium polymorphum
- Plasmodium praefalciparum
- Plasmodium pulmophilium
- Plasmodium pythonias
- Plasmodium quelea
- Plasmodium reichenowi
- Plasmodium relictum
- Plasmodium reniai
- Plasmodium rhadinurum
- Plasmodium rhacodactyli
- Plasmodium rhodaini
- Plasmodium robinsoni
- Plasmodium rousetti
- Plasmodium rousseloti
- Plasmodium rouxi
- Plasmodium sandoshami
- Plasmodium sapaaensis
- Plasmodium sasai
- Plasmodium saurocaudatum
- Plasmodium schwetzi
- Plasmodium sergentorum
- Plasmodium scelopori
- Plasmodium scorzai
- Plasmodium semiovale
- Plasmodium semnopitheci
- Plasmodium silvaticum
- Plasmodium simium
- Plasmodium simplex
- Plasmodium smirnovi
- Plasmodium snounoui
- Plasmodium stellatum
- Plasmodium stuthionis
- Plasmodium tanzaniae
- Plasmodium tenue
- Plasmodium tejerai
- Plasmodium telfordi
- Plasmodium tomodoni
- Plasmodium torrealbai
- Plasmodium toucani
- Plasmodium traguli
- Plasmodium tranieri
- Plasmodium tribolonti
- Plasmodium tropiduri
- Plasmodium tumbayaensis
- Plasmodium tyrio
- Plasmodium uilenbergi
- Plasmodium uluguruense
- Plasmodium uncinatum
- Plasmodium unalis
- Plasmodium uzungwiense
- Plasmodium watteni
- Plasmodium wenyoni
- Plasmodium vacuolatum
- Plasmodium valkiunasi
- Plasmodium vastator
- Plasmodium vaughani
- Plasmodium vautieri
- Plasmodium venkataramiahii
- Plasmodium vinckei
- Plasmodium vivax
- Plasmodium vivax-like
- Plasmodium volans
- Plasmodium voltaicum
- Plasmodium wenyoni
- Plasmodium yoelii
- Plasmodium youngi
- Plasmodium zonuriae

== Unnamed species ==
At least one species has been isolated from the mandrill (Mandrillus leucophaeus) that awaits full publication. It is currently known as Plasmodium sp. DAJ-2004.

At least one species related to P. ovale appears to be present in chimpanzees. It is known only from a DNA sequence and awaits description.

P. vivax strains can be separated into two distinct types depending on the organisation of the A and S rRNA genes. A gene conversion occurred in an Old World strain and this mutated strain give rise to a new calde of parasites in the New World. The Old World strains were subsequently re introduced - possibly via the slave trade - and these are related to the monkey parasite P. simium. The specific name Plasmodium collinsi has been proposed for the New World strains but this has not yet been accepted.

A second mutation is present in the ORF 470 gene of the plasmid in the New World P. vivax strains. This protein is highly conserved. In the Old World strains of P. vivax and its relations a valine is present. In the New World strains this residue has been replaced by an isoleucine (G -> A in the first codon position).

Two separate strains of P. vivax can be identified on the basis of the circumsporozoite protein (CSP) gene. Both of these alleles can be found in P. simium and they occur both in the New and Old Worlds. This suggests a complex history of transmission across the world and between species.

Another as yet unnamed species was isolated from humans in Madang, Papua New Guinea in 1993. This species differed immunologically and genetically from then generally recognised species infecting humans. Additional isolates of this putative species were also found in Sepik also in Papua New Guinea, Brazil, Indonesia and Madagascar. The circumsporozoite protein of this species appears to be identical to that of Plasmodium semiovale. At least two species of mosquito Anopheles deaneorum and Anopheles oswaldoi appear to be capable of transmitting this parasite. These reports have not gone unchallenged and the status of this putative species is unclear at present. This unnamed species has been named Plasmodium vivax-like and its genome has been sequenced. It is the closest relative of P. vivax.

The species that infects water buffalo is presently unnamed.

Plasmodium odocoiliei appears to be at least two species with only one name.

== Species grouped by subgenus ==
This listing while currently incomplete will be updated when the relevant information becomes available.

Asiamoeba

- Plasmodium draconis
- Plasmodium lionatum
- Plasmodium saurocaudatum
- Plasmodium vastator

Bennetinia

- Plasmodium juxtanucleare

Carinamoeba

- Plasmodium attenuatum
- Plasmodium auffenbergi
- Plasmodium basilisci
- Plasmodium clelandi
- Plasmodium cordyli
- Plasmodium kadogoi
- Plasmodium kaninii
- Plasmodium lygosomae
- Plasmodium mabuiae
- Plasmodium marginatum
- Plasmodium minasense
- Plasmodium rhadinurum
- Plasmodium sapaaensis
- Plasmodium scelopori
- Plasmodium volans

Giovannolaia

- Plasmodium anasum
- Plasmodium buteonis
- Plasmodium circumflexum
- Plasmodium dissanaikei
- Plasmodium durae
- Plasmodium fallax
- Plasmodium ghadiriani
- Plasmodium gundersi
- Plasmodium heroni
- Plasmodium lophurae
- Plasmodium octamerium
- Plasmodium tranieri

Haemamoeba

- Plasmodium cathemerium
- Plasmodium coggeshalli
- Plasmodium coturnixi
- Plasmodium elongatum
- Plasmodium gallinaceum
- Plasmodium giovannolai
- Plasmodium griffithsi
- Plasmodium lutzi
- Plasmodium matutinum
- Plasmodium paddae
- Plasmodium parvulum
- Plasmodium relictum
- Plasmodium tejerai

Huffia

- Plasmodium elongatum
- Plasmodium hermani
- Plasmodium huffi

Lacertamoeba

- Plasmodium agamae
- Plasmodium arachniformis
- Plasmodium beebei
- Plasmodium brygooi
- Plasmodium cnemaspi
- Plasmodium fischeri
- Plasmodium floridense
- Plasmodium gologoense
- Plasmodium holaspi
- Plasmodium intabazwe
- Plasmodium kachelibaensis
- Plasmodium kyaii
- Plasmodium lepidoptiformis
- Plasmodium loveridgei
- Plasmodium maculilabre
- Plasmodium mossambica
- Plasmodium pitmani
- Plasmodium tanzaniae
- Plasmodium torrealbai
- Plasmodium tropiduri
- Plasmodium uluguruense
- Plasmodium uzungwiense
- Plasmodium vautieri
- Plasmodium zonuriae

Laverania

- Plasmodium adleri
- Plasmodium billbrayi
- Plasmodium billcollinsi
- Plasmodium blacklocki
- Plasmodium falciparum
- Plasmodium gaboni
- Plasmodium lomamiensis
- Plasmodium praefalciparum
- Plasmodium reichenowi

Novyella

- Plasmodium accipiteris
- Plasmodium bambusicolai
- Plasmodium corradettii
- Plasmodium delichoni
- Plasmodium globularis
- Plasmodium hoionucleophilum
- Plasmodium homopolare
- Plasmodium jiangi
- Plasmodium kempi
- Plasmodium lucens
- Plasmodium megaglobularis
- Plasmodium merulae
- Plasmodium mohammedi
- Plasmodium multivacuolaris
- Plasmodium pachysomum
- Plasmodium papernai
- Plasmodium parahexamerium
- Plasmodium paranucleophilum
- Plasmodium stellatum
- Plasmodium tenue
- Plasmodium unalis
- Plasmodium vaughani

Nyssorhynchus

- Plasmodium dominicum

Ophidiella

- Plasmodium melanoleuca
- Plasmodium pessoai
- Plasmodium pythonias
- Plasmodium tomodoni
- Plasmodium wenyoni

Papernaia

- Plasmodium ashfordi
- Plasmodium beaucournui
- Plasmodium bertii
- Plasmodium columbae
- Plasmodium dherteae
- Plasmodium durae
- Plasmodium formosanum
- Plasmodium gabaldoni
- Plasmodium garnhami
- Plasmodium golvani
- Plasmodium hegneri
- Plasmodium hexamerium
- Plasmodium jeanriouxi
- Plasmodium lenoblei
- Plasmodium nucleophilum
- Plasmodium paranucleophilum
- Plasmodium pediocetae
- Plasmodium pinotti
- Plasmodium polare
- Plasmodium reniai
- Plasmodium rouxi
- Plasmodium snounoui
- Plasmodium valkiunasi

Paraplasmodium

- Plasmodium chiricahuae
- Plasmodium mexicanum
- Plasmodium pifanoi

Plasmodium

- Plasmodium bouillize
- Plasmodium brasilianum
- Plasmodium carteri
- Plasmodium cercopitheci
- Plasmodium coatneyi
- Plasmodium cynomolgi
- Plasmodium cynomolgi bastianelli
- Plasmodium cynomolgi ceylonensis
- Plasmodium cynomolgi cynomolgi
- Plasmodium eylesi
- Plasmodium fieldi
- Plasmodium fragile
- Plasmodium georgesi
- Plasmodium girardi
- Plasmodium gonderi
- Plasmodium inui
- Plasmodium jefferyi
- Plasmodium joyeuxi
- Plasmodium knowlesi
- Plasmodium knowlesi edesoni
- Plasmodium knowlesi knowlesi
- Plasmodium hyobati
- Plasmodium malariae
- Plasmodium ovale
- Plasmodium petersi
- Plasmodium pitheci
- Plasmodium rhodiani
- Plasmodium schweitzi
- Plasmodium semiovale
- Plasmodium semnopitheci
- Plasmodium silvaticum
- Plasmodium simium
- Plasmodium vivax
- Plasmodium vivax-like
- Plasmodium youngi

Sauramoeba

- Plasmodium achiotense
- Plasmodium acuminatum
- Plasmodium aeuminatum
- Plasmodium balli
- Plasmodium beltrani
- Plasmodium brumpti
- Plasmodium caucasica
- Plasmodium cnemidophori
- Plasmodium diploglossi
- Plasmodium giganteum
- Plasmodium giganteum australis
- Plasmodium guyannense
- Plasmodium heischi
- Plasmodium josephinae
- Plasmodium kentropyxi
- Plasmodium michikoa
- Plasmodium pelaezi
- Plasmodium robinsoni

Vinckeia

- Plasmodium achromaticum
- Plasmodium aegyptensis
- Plasmodium anomaluri
- Plasmodium atheruri
- Plasmodium berghei
- Plasmodium booliati
- Plasmodium brodeni
- Plasmodium bubalis
- Plasmodium bucki
- Plasmodium caprae
- Plasmodium cephalophi
- Plasmodium chabaudi
- Plasmodium coulangesi
- Plasmodium cyclopsi
- Plasmodium foleyi
- Plasmodium girardi
- Plasmodium incertae
- Plasmodium inopinatum
- Plasmodium landauae
- Plasmodium lemuris
- Plasmodium limnotragi
- Plasmodium mackiei
- Plasmodium malagasi
- Plasmodium melanipherum
- Plasmodium narayani
- Plasmodium odocoilei
- Plasmodium percygarnhami
- Plasmodium pulmophilium
- Plasmodium rousetti
- Plasmodium sandoshami
- Plasmodium traguli
- Plasmodium tyrio
- Plasmodium uilenbergi
- Plasmodium vinckei
- Plasmodium voltaicum
- Plasmodium watteni
- Plasmodium yoelli

== Species subsequently reclassified into other genera ==
The literature is replete with species initially classified as Plasmodium that have been subsequently reclassified. With the increasing use of DNA taxonomy some of these may be once again be classified as Plasmodium. This appears increasing likely as it has been shown that Hepatocystis and Polychromophilus appear to lie within the genus Plasmodium.

The following species have been classified into the genus Hepatocystis:

- P. epomophori
- P. kochi
- P. limnotragi Van Denberghe 1937
- P. pteropi Breinl 1911
- P. ratufae Donavan 1920
- P. vassali Laveran 1905

The following species have been classified into the genus Haemoemba:

- P. praecox
- P. rousseleti

The following species has been classified into the genus Garnia:

- P. gonatodi
- P. utingensis
- P. uranoscodoni

The following species have been classified into the genus Fallisia:

- P. siamense
- P. neotropicalis

The following species has been classified into the genus Polychromophilus:

- P. murinus

== Species now considered to be junior synonyms ==
P. osmaniae and P. shortii are currently considered to be junior synonyms of P. inui.

P. biziurae and P. inconstans are now regarded as a junior synonym of P. relictum.

== Species of dubious validity ==
The following species that have been described in the literature are currently regarded as being of questionable validity (nomen dubium).

- Plasmodium adunyinkai
- Plasmodium bitis
- Plasmodium bowiei
- Plasmodium brasiliense
- Plasmodium brucei
- Plasmodium bufoni
- Plasmodium caprea
- Plasmodium carinii
- Plasmodium causi
- Plasmodium chalcidi
- Plasmodium chloropsidis
- Plasmodium centropi
- Plasmodium corradettii
- Plasmodium danilweskyi
- Plasmodium divergens
- Plasmodium effusum
- Plasmodium fabesia
- Plasmodium falconi
- Plasmodium gambeli
- Plasmodium galinulae
- Plasmodium herodiadis
- Plasmodium leanucteus
- Plasmodium malariae raupachi
- Plasmodium metastaticum
- Plasmodium moruony
- Plasmodium parajuxtanucleare
- Plasmodium periprocoti
- Plasmodium pinorrii
- Plasmodium ploceii
- Plasmodium struthionis
- Plasmodium taiwanensis
