= Plasmodium anomaluri =

Scientific classification
- Domain: Eukaryota
- Clade: Diaphoretickes
- Clade: SAR
- Clade: Alveolata
- Phylum: Apicomplexa
- Class: Aconoidasida
- Order: Haemospororida
- Family: Plasmodiidae
- Genus: Plasmodium
- Species: P. anomaluri

Binomial name
- Plasmodium anomaluri Pringle, 1960

Species of single-celled organism

Plasmodium anomaluri is a parasite of the genus Plasmodium subgenus Vinckeia. As in all Plasmodium species, P. anomaluri has both vertebrate and insect hosts. The vertebrate hosts for this parasite are mammals.

== Taxonomy ==
The parasite was first described by Pringle in 1960.

== Distribution ==
This species is found in Tanzania.

== Vectors ==
Not known.

== Hosts ==
This species infects African flying squirrels (Anomalurus fraseri orientalis).
