= Plasmodium lacertiliae =

Scientific classification
- Domain: Eukaryota
- Clade: Sar
- Clade: Alveolata
- Phylum: Apicomplexa
- Class: Aconoidasida
- Order: Haemospororida
- Family: Plasmodiidae
- Genus: Plasmodium
- Species: P. lacertiliae

Binomial name
- Plasmodium lacertiliae Thompson and Hart, 1946

Species of parasite

Plasmodium lacertiliae is a parasite of the genus Plasmodium.

Like all Plasmodium species P. lacertiliae has both vertebrate and insect hosts. The vertebrate hosts for this parasite are reptiles.

== Description ==
The parasite was first described by Thompson and Hart in 1946.

== Geographical occurrence ==
This species is found in New Guinea.

== Clinical features and host pathology ==
Hosts of this species include the crocodile skink (Tribolonotus species) and Leiolopisma fuscum.
