= Plasmodium parahexamerium =

Scientific classification
- Domain: Eukaryota
- Clade: Sar
- Clade: Alveolata
- Phylum: Apicomplexa
- Class: Aconoidasida
- Order: Haemospororida
- Family: Plasmodiidae
- Genus: Plasmodium
- Species: P. parahexamerium

Binomial name
- Plasmodium parahexamerium Valkiūnas et al., 2009

Species of single-celled organism

Plasmodium parahexamerium is a parasite of the genus Plasmodium, in the subgenus Novyella. As in all Plasmodium species, P. parahexamerium has both vertebrate and insect hosts. The vertebrate hosts for this parasite are birds.

== Taxonomy ==
The parasite was first described by Valkiūnas et al. in 2009.

== Distribution ==
This parasite is found in West Africa.

== Vectors ==
Not known.

== Hosts ==
P. parahexamerium infects the white-tailed alethe (Alethe diademata).
