= Plasmodium intabazwe =

Scientific classification
- Domain: Eukaryota
- Clade: Sar
- Clade: Alveolata
- Phylum: Apicomplexa
- Class: Aconoidasida
- Order: Haemospororida
- Family: Plasmodiidae
- Genus: Plasmodium
- Species: P. intabazwe

Binomial name
- Plasmodium intabazwe van As et al, 2016

Species of single-celled organism

Plasmodium intabazwe is a parasite of the genus Plasmodium subgenus Lacertamoeba.

As in all Plasmodium species, P. intabazwe has both vertebrate and insect hosts. The vertebrate hosts for this parasite are reptiles.

== Taxonomy ==
This parasite was first described by van As et al in 2016.

== Distribution ==
This species is found in Africa and nearby islands.

== Hosts ==
This parasite infects the common crag lizard (Pseudocordylus melanotus).
