= Plasmodium pulmophilium =

Scientific classification
- Domain: Eukaryota
- Clade: Sar
- Clade: Alveolata
- Phylum: Apicomplexa
- Class: Aconoidasida
- Order: Haemospororida
- Family: Plasmodiidae
- Genus: Plasmodium
- Species: P. pulmophilium

Binomial name
- Plasmodium pulmophilium Killick-Kendrick, 1973

Species of single-celled organism

Plasmodium pulmophilium is a parasite of the genus Plasmodium subgenus Vinckeia. Like all Plasmodium species, P. pulmophilium has both vertebrate and insect hosts. The vertebrate hosts for this parasite are mammals.

== Description ==
Plasmodium pulmophilium was described from the blood of flying squirrels in the Ivory Coast.

== Distribution ==
Plasmodium pulmophilium has only been described in the Ivory Coast.

== Hosts ==
Plasmodium pulmophilium has only been described from the blood of Anomalurus peli. It is not known if it causes disease in this host.
