= Plasmodium odocoilei =

Scientific classification
- Domain: Eukaryota
- Supergroup: Alveolata
- Phylum: Apicomplexa
- Class: Aconoidasida
- Order: Haemospororida
- Family: Plasmodiidae
- Genus: Plasmodium
- Species: P. odocoilei

Binomial name
- Plasmodium odocoilei Garnham and Kuttler, 1980

Species of single-celled organism

Plasmodium odocoilei is a species of parasites, that causes malaria in white-tailed deer.

== Taxonomy ==
This species was discovered in 1967 in Texas and formally named in 1980. It was rediscovered again in North America in 2016.

This species is a member of the subgenus Vinckeia of the genus Plasmodium. The genus Plasmodium is most closely related to Polychromophilus. The relation between these genera is under debate at present and a revision of the taxonomy seems likely to be required.

From this study it seems that Plasmodium odocoilei belongs to a clade that is most closely related to Polychromophilus. This study was based on mitochondria, plastid and nuclear genes which makes it likely to have the correct topology.

Molecular genetic studies have shown that this species is actually at least two separate species that diverged between 2.3 million years ago to 6 million years ago.

== Description ==
This species has large vacuoles in the erythroctic stages. It causes deformation and discolouration of the host erythrocyte.

== Vectors ==
- Anopheles punctipennis

== Hosts ==
This species has been detected in while-tailed deer (Odocoileus virginianus) in the eastern United States.

- White-tailed deer (Odocoileus virginianus)
