= Plasmodium morulum =

Scientific classification
- Domain: Eukaryota
- Clade: Sar
- Clade: Alveolata
- Phylum: Apicomplexa
- Class: Aconoidasida
- Order: Haemospororida
- Family: Plasmodiidae
- Genus: Plasmodium
- Species: P. morulum

Binomial name
- Plasmodium morulum Telford, 1970

Species of single-celled organism

Plasmodium morulum is a parasite of the genus Plasmodium.

Like all Plasmodium species P. morulum has both vertebrate and insect hosts. The vertebrate hosts for this parasite are reptiles.

== Description ==
This species was first described by Telford in 1970.

== Geographical occurrence ==
This species is found in Panama.

== Vectors ==
Not known.

== Clinical features and host pathology ==
This species infects the lizard Mabuya mabouya.
