= Plasmodium gonatodi =

Scientific classification
- Domain: Eukaryota
- Clade: Sar
- Clade: Alveolata
- Phylum: Apicomplexa
- Class: Aconoidasida
- Order: Haemospororida
- Family: Plasmodiidae
- Genus: Plasmodium
- Species: P. gonatodi

Binomial name
- Plasmodium gonatodi Telford, 1970

Species of single-celled organism

Plasmodium gonatodi is a parasite of the genus Plasmodium.

Like all Plasmodium species P. gonatodi has both vertebrate and insect hosts. The vertebrate hosts for this parasite are reptiles.

== Description ==
This species was first described by Telford in 1970.

Both proerythrocytes and erythrocytes are commonly infected. The infected cells are hypertrophied and distorted and their nuclei are displaced.

The schizonts are polymorphic and contain 12-46 nuclei when apparently mature.

Prematuration sexual stages may be irregularly shaped and larger than mature gametocytes.

The gametocytes are elongate.

== Geographical occurrence ==
This species is found in Panama.

== Vectors ==
Not known.

== Clinical features and host pathology ==
This species infects the lizard Gonatodes albogularis fuscus.
