= Plasmodium australis =

Scientific classification
- Domain: Eukaryota
- Clade: Sar
- Clade: Alveolata
- Phylum: Apicomplexa
- Class: Aconoidasida
- Order: Haemospororida
- Family: Plasmodiidae
- Genus: Plasmodium
- Species: P. australis

Binomial name
- Plasmodium australis Telford, 1988

Species of single-celled organism

Plasmodium australis is a protozoan parasite of the genus Plasmodium.

Like all Plasmodium species P. australis has both vertebrate and insect hosts. The vertebrate hosts for this parasite are lizards.

== Description ==
The parasite was first described by Mackerras in 1961 and was designated as Plasmodium giganteum. It was redescribed in 1988 by Telford who recognised it as a separate species.

== Geographical occurrence ==
This species is found in Australia.
