= Plasmodium clelandi =

Scientific classification
- Domain: Eukaryota
- Clade: Sar
- Clade: Alveolata
- Phylum: Apicomplexa
- Class: Aconoidasida
- Order: Haemospororida
- Family: Plasmodiidae
- Genus: Plasmodium
- Species: P. clelandi

Binomial name
- Plasmodium clelandi Manawadu, 1972

Species of single-celled organism

Plasmodium clelandi is a parasite of the genus Plasmodium subgenus Carinamoeba.

Like all Plasmodium species P. clelandi has both vertebrate and insect hosts. The vertebrate hosts for this parasite are reptiles.

== Description ==
This species was described by Manawadu in 1972. It was named after the eminent cardio-thoracic surgeon William Paton Cleland.

== Distribution ==
This species occurs in Sri Lanka.

== Hosts ==
This species infects the Bengal monitor lizard (Varanus bengalensis) and land monitor lizard (Varanus cepedianus).
