= Plasmodium buteonis =

Scientific classification
- Domain: Eukaryota
- Clade: Sar
- Clade: Alveolata
- Phylum: Apicomplexa
- Class: Aconoidasida
- Order: Haemospororida
- Family: Plasmodiidae
- Genus: Plasmodium
- Species: P. buteonis

Binomial name
- Plasmodium buteonis Paperna et al., 2007

Species of single-celled organism

Plasmodium buteonis is a parasite of the genus Plasmodium subgenus Giovannolaia.

Like all Plasmodium species P. buteonis has both vertebrate and insect hosts. The vertebrate hosts for this parasite are birds.

== Taxonomy ==
The parasite was first described by Paperna et al. in 2007. P. buteonis cannot be distinguished from some others of the same subgenus – P. gabaldoni and P. homocircumfexum – and may in fact not be a valid name.

== Distribution ==
This parasite is found in Israel.

== Hosts ==
P. buteonis infects the common buzzard (Buteo buteo).
