= Plasmodium caucasica =

Scientific classification
- Domain: Eukaryota
- Clade: Sar
- Clade: Alveolata
- Phylum: Apicomplexa
- Class: Aconoidasida
- Order: Haemospororida
- Family: Plasmodiidae
- Genus: Plasmodium
- Species: P. caucasica

Binomial name
- Plasmodium caucasica Telford, 2013

Species of single-celled organism

Plasmodium caucasica is a parasite of the genus Plasmodium subgenus Sauramoeba. As in all Plasmodium species, P. caucasica has both vertebrate and insect hosts. The vertebrate hosts for this parasite are reptiles.

== Description ==
The parasite was first described by Telford in 2013. Meronts are very large (11-21 x 8-17 microns) and produce 32-67 merozoites each. The gametocytes are ovoid to elongate and measure 6-14 x 2.5-6 microns.

== Distribution ==
This species is found in Azerbaijan.

== Hosts ==
This species infects the rock agama Paralaudakia caucasia.

== Vectors ==
Not known.
