= Plasmodium guyannense =

Scientific classification
- Domain: Eukaryota
- Clade: Sar
- Clade: Alveolata
- Phylum: Apicomplexa
- Class: Aconoidasida
- Order: Haemospororida
- Family: Plasmodiidae
- Genus: Plasmodium
- Species: P. guyannense

Binomial name
- Plasmodium guyannense Telford, 1979

Species of single-celled organism

Plasmodium guyannense is a parasite of the genus Plasmodium subgenus Sauramoeba. As in all Plasmodium species, P. guyannense has both vertebrate and insect hosts. The vertebrate hosts for this parasite are reptiles.

== Taxonomy ==
The parasite was first described by Telford in 1979. This species had previously been considered to be Plasmodium cnemidophori.

== Description ==
Young trophozoites contain prominent vacuoles.

Schizonts contain 40 to 74 nuclei and have pigment.

== Distribution ==
This species is found in Guyana, South America.

== Hosts ==
The only known host is the lizard Plica plica.
