= Plasmodium capistrani =

Scientific classification
- Domain: Eukaryota
- Clade: Sar
- Clade: Alveolata
- Phylum: Apicomplexa
- Class: Aconoidasida
- Order: Haemospororida
- Family: Plasmodiidae
- Genus: Plasmodium
- Species: P. capistrani

Binomial name
- Plasmodium capistrani Russell, 1932

Species of single-celled organism

Plasmodium capistrani is a parasite of the genus Plasmodium.

Like all Plasmodium species P. capistrani has both vertebrate and insect hosts. The vertebrate hosts for this parasite are birds.

== Description ==
The parasite was first described by Russell in 1932.

== Geographical occurrence ==
This species is found in the Philippines.

== Clinical features and host pathology ==
The hosts for this parasite include the painted quail Excalfactoria lineata.
