= Plasmodium booliati =

Scientific classification
- Domain: Eukaryota
- Clade: Sar
- Clade: Alveolata
- Phylum: Apicomplexa
- Class: Aconoidasida
- Order: Haemospororida
- Family: Plasmodiidae
- Genus: Plasmodium
- Species: P. booliati

Binomial name
- Plasmodium booliati Sandosham et al., 1965

Species of single-celled organism

Plasmodium booliati is a parasite of the genus Plasmodium subgenus Vinckeia. As in all Plasmodium species, P. booliati has both vertebrate and insect hosts. The vertebrate hosts for this parasite are mammals.

== Taxonomy ==
The parasite was first described by Sandosham et al. in 1965.

== Distribution ==
This species occurs in Malaya.

== Vectors ==
Not known.

== Hosts ==
The only known host of this species is the Malayan giant flying squirrel.
