= Plasmodium multivacuolaris =

Scientific classification
- Domain: Eukaryota
- Clade: Sar
- Clade: Alveolata
- Phylum: Apicomplexa
- Class: Aconoidasida
- Order: Haemospororida
- Family: Plasmodiidae
- Genus: Plasmodium
- Species: P. multivacuolaris

Binomial name
- Plasmodium multivacuolaris Valkiūnas et al., 2008

Species of single-celled organism

Plasmodium multivacuolaris is a parasite of the genus Plasmodium subgenus Novyella

Like all Plasmodium species P. multivacuolaris has both vertebrate and insect hosts. The vertebrate hosts for this parasite are birds.

== Taxonomy ==
The parasite was first described by Valkiūnas et al. in 2008.

== Distribution ==
This parasite is found in West Africa.

== Vectors ==
Not known.

== Hosts ==
P. multivacuolaris infects the yellow-whiskered greenbul (Andropadus latirostris).
