= Plasmodium mackerrasae =

Scientific classification
- Domain: Eukaryota
- Clade: Sar
- Clade: Alveolata
- Phylum: Apicomplexa
- Class: Aconoidasida
- Order: Haemospororida
- Family: Plasmodiidae
- Genus: Plasmodium
- Species: P. mackerrasae

Binomial name
- Plasmodium mackerrasae Telford, 1979

Species of single-celled organism

Plasmodium mackerrasae is a parasite of the genus Plasmodium.

Like all Plasmodium species P. mackerrasae has both vertebrate and insect hosts. The vertebrate hosts for this parasite are reptiles.

== Description ==
The parasite was first described by Telford in 1979.

== Geographical occurrence ==
This parasite is found in Australia.

== Clinical features and host pathology ==
This species occurs naturally in the Australian skinks Egernia cunninghami and Egernia striolata. It will also infect Egernia whitei.
