= Plasmodium josephinae =

Scientific classification
- Domain: Eukaryota
- Clade: Sar
- Clade: Alveolata
- Phylum: Apicomplexa
- Class: Aconoidasida
- Order: Haemospororida
- Family: Plasmodiidae
- Genus: Plasmodium
- Species: P. josephinae

Binomial name
- Plasmodium josephinae Peláez, 1967

Species of single-celled organism

Plasmodium josephinae is a parasite of the genus Plasmodium subgenus Sauramoeba. It was described in 1967 by Peláez. As in all Plasmodium species, P. josephinae has both vertebrate and insect hosts. The vertebrate hosts for this parasite are reptiles.

== Taxonomy ==
This species was described by Peláez in 1967.

== Distribution ==
This species occurs in Mexico.
