= Plasmodium maculilabre =

Scientific classification
- Domain: Eukaryota
- Clade: Sar
- Clade: Alveolata
- Phylum: Apicomplexa
- Class: Aconoidasida
- Order: Haemospororida
- Family: Plasmodiidae
- Genus: Plasmodium
- Species: P. maculilabre

Binomial name
- Plasmodium maculilabre Schwetz, 1931

Species of single-celled organism

Plasmodium maculilabre is a parasite of the genus Plasmodium.

Like all Plasmodium species P. maculilabre has both vertebrate and insect hosts. In particular, P. maculilabre infects Mabuya maculilabris in the Congo Basin.

== Description ==
The parasite was first described by Schwetz in 1931.

== Geographical occurrence ==
This species is found in Africa.

== Clinical features and host pathology ==
The only known host is the skink Mabuia maculilabris.
