= Plasmodium pelaezi =

Scientific classification
- Domain: Eukaryota
- Clade: Sar
- Clade: Alveolata
- Phylum: Apicomplexa
- Class: Aconoidasida
- Order: Haemospororida
- Family: Plasmodiidae
- Genus: Plasmodium
- Species: P. pelaezi

Binomial name
- Plasmodium pelaezi Malagón and Salmeron, 1988

Species of single-celled organism

Plasmodium pelaezi is a parasite of the genus Plasmodium subgenus Sauramoeba. As in all Plasmodium species P. pelaezi has both vertebrate and insect hosts. The vertebrate hosts for this parasite are lizards.

== Description ==
This species was first described by Malagón and Salmeron in 1988.

== Distribution ==
This species was described in lizards found at Chila de la Sal, Puebla, Mexico.

== Hosts ==
The only known host is the iguanid lizard Urosaurus bicarinatus bicarinatus.
