= Plasmodium watteni =

Scientific classification
- Domain: Eukaryota
- Clade: Sar
- Clade: Alveolata
- Phylum: Apicomplexa
- Class: Aconoidasida
- Order: Haemospororida
- Family: Plasmodiidae
- Genus: Plasmodium
- Species: P. watteni

Binomial name
- Plasmodium watteni Lien and Cross, 1968

Species of single-celled organism

Plasmodium watteni is a parasite of the genus Plasmodium subgenus Vinckeia. As in all Plasmodium species, P. watteni has both vertebrate and insect hosts. The vertebrate hosts for this parasite are mammals.

== Taxonomy ==
The parasite was first described by Lien and Cross in 1968.

== Distribution ==
This species is found in Taiwan.

== Vectors ==
Not known.

== Hosts ==
The only known host of this species is the Formosan giant flying squirrel (Petaurista petaurista grandis).
