= Plasmodium fischeri =

Scientific classification
- Domain: Eukaryota
- Clade: Sar
- Clade: Alveolata
- Phylum: Apicomplexa
- Class: Aconoidasida
- Order: Haemospororida
- Family: Plasmodiidae
- Genus: Plasmodium
- Species: P. fischeri

Binomial name
- Plasmodium fischeri Ball and Pringle, 1965

Species of single-celled organism

Plasmodium fischeri is a parasite of the genus Plasmodium subgenus Lacertamoeba.

Like all Plasmodium species P. fischeri has both vertebrate and insect hosts. The vertebrate hosts for this parasite are reptiles.

== Description ==
The parasite was first described by Ball and Pringle in 1965.

== Geographical occurrence ==
This species is found in Kenya, Africa.

== Clinical features and host pathology ==
The only known host of this species is Fischer's or the Eastern Usambara chameleon (Chamaeleo fischeri). This host species is also known as Chamaeleo excubitor, Bradypodion fischeri and Kinyongia fischeri.
