= Plasmodium lionatum =

Scientific classification
- Domain: Eukaryota
- Clade: Sar
- Clade: Alveolata
- Phylum: Apicomplexa
- Class: Aconoidasida
- Order: Haemospororida
- Family: Plasmodiidae
- Genus: Plasmodium
- Species: P. lionatum

Binomial name
- Plasmodium lionatum Telford, 1982

Species of single-celled organism

Plasmodium lionatum is a species of apicomplexan parasite in the family Plasmodiidae. Like all Plasmodium species P. lionatum has both vertebrate and insect hosts. The vertebrate hosts for this parasite are lizards.

== Description ==
The parasite was first described by Telford in 1982.

== Distribution ==
This species is found in Thailand.

== Hosts ==
The only known host is the flying gecko (Ptychozoon lionatum).
