= Plasmodium georgesi =

Scientific classification
- Domain: Eukaryota
- Clade: Sar
- Clade: Alveolata
- Phylum: Apicomplexa
- Class: Aconoidasida
- Order: Haemospororida
- Family: Plasmodiidae
- Genus: Plasmodium
- Species: P. georgesi

Binomial name
- Plasmodium georgesi Poirriez et al., 1993

Species of single-celled organism

Plasmodium georgesi is a parasite of the genus Plasmodium subgenus Plasmodium.

Like all Plasmodium species P. georgesi has both vertebrate and insect hosts. The vertebrate hosts for this parasite are mammals.

== Description ==
This species was first described by Poirriez et al. in 1993.

The trophozoites have long crescent-shaped nuclei (surface area 2.18 +/- 0.25 square micrometres).

The pigment is stored as short rods.

== Geographical occurrence ==
Plasmodium georgesi has been found in the Central African Republic.

== Clinical features and host pathology ==
Plasmodium georgesi, Plasmodium petersi and Plasmodium gonderi are the only Plasmodium species found to date (2008) in Cercocebus monkeys.

Plasmodium georgesi infects Cercocebus albigena and Cercocebus galeritus agilis causing a remitting/relapsing form of malaria.
