= Plasmodium bambusicolai =

Scientific classification
- Domain: Eukaryota
- Clade: Sar
- Clade: Alveolata
- Phylum: Apicomplexa
- Class: Aconoidasida
- Order: Haemospororida
- Family: Plasmodiidae
- Genus: Plasmodium
- Species: P. bambusicolai

Binomial name
- Plasmodium bambusicolai Huang and Huang, 1995

Species of single-celled organism

Plasmodium bambusicolai is a species of the genus Plasmodium subgenus Novyella.

As in all species of this genus, it has both vertebrate and insect hosts. The vertebrate host are birds.
