= Plasmodium koreafense =

Scientific classification
- Domain: Eukaryota
- Clade: Sar
- Clade: Alveolata
- Phylum: Apicomplexa
- Class: Aconoidasida
- Order: Haemospororida
- Family: Plasmodiidae
- Genus: Plasmodium
- Species: P. koreafense

Binomial name
- Plasmodium koreafense Perkins and Austin, 2009

Species of single-celled organism

Plasmodium koreafense is a parasite of the genus Plasmodium.

Like all Plasmodium species P. koreafense has both vertebrate and insect hosts. The vertebrate hosts for this parasite are reptiles.

== Description ==
The parasite was first described by Perkins and Austin in 2009.

== Geographical occurrence ==
This species is found in New Guinea.
