= Plasmodium coggeshalli =

Scientific classification
- Domain: Eukaryota
- Clade: Sar
- Clade: Alveolata
- Phylum: Apicomplexa
- Class: Aconoidasida
- Order: Haemospororida
- Family: Plasmodiidae
- Genus: Plasmodium
- Species: P. coggeshalli

Binomial name
- Plasmodium coggeshalli Gres & Landau, 1997

Species of single-celled organism

Plasmodium coggeshalli is a parasite of the genus Plasmodium subgenus Haemamoeba.

Like all Plasmodium species P. coggeshalli has both vertebrate and insect hosts. The vertebrate hosts for this parasite are birds.

== Taxonomy ==
The type specimen had been originally classified as Plasmodium lophurae but was described as a new species by Gres and Landau in 1997 based on morphology of the parasite and host cell.
