= Plasmodium scelopori =

Scientific classification
- Domain: Eukaryota
- Clade: Sar
- Clade: Alveolata
- Phylum: Apicomplexa
- Class: Aconoidasida
- Order: Haemospororida
- Family: Plasmodiidae
- Genus: Plasmodium
- Species: P. scelopori

Binomial name
- Plasmodium scelopori Telford, 1977

Species of single-celled organism

Plasmodium scelopori is a parasite of the genus Plasmodium subgenus Carinamoeba.

Like all Plasmodium species P. scelopori has both vertebrate and insect hosts. The vertebrate hosts for this parasite are reptiles.

== Taxonomy ==
The parasite was first described by Telford in 1977.

== Description ==
The meronts measure 4-8 x 3-6 microns.

The merozoites are arranged in a fan like distribution. Pigment may be present in green-yellow clumps in the centre of the host cell.

The gametocytes are rounded.

== Distribution ==
This species is found in Belize, Costa Rica and Honduras.

== Hosts ==
This species infects the spiny lizards Sceloporus teapensis and Sceloporus varabilis.
