= Plasmodium coulangesi =

Scientific classification
- Domain: Eukaryota
- Clade: Sar
- Clade: Alveolata
- Phylum: Apicomplexa
- Class: Aconoidasida
- Order: Haemospororida
- Family: Plasmodiidae
- Genus: Plasmodium
- Species: P. coulangesi

Binomial name
- Plasmodium coulangesi Lepers et al.,1989

Species of single-celled organism

Plasmodium coulangesi is a parasite of the genus Plasmodium subgenus Vinckeia. As in all Plasmodium species, P. coulangesi has both vertebrate and insect hosts. The vertebrate hosts for this parasite are mammals.

== Taxonomy ==
The parasite was first described by Lepers et al. in 1989.

== Clinical features and host pathology ==
The only known host for this species is the lemur Lemur macaco macaco.
