= Plasmodium octamerium =

Scientific classification
- Domain: Eukaryota
- Clade: Sar
- Clade: Alveolata
- Phylum: Apicomplexa
- Class: Aconoidasida
- Order: Haemospororida
- Family: Plasmodiidae
- Genus: Plasmodium
- Species: P. octamerium

Binomial name
- Plasmodium octamerium Manwell, 1968

Species of single-celled organism

Plasmodium octamerium is a parasite of the genus Plasmodium subgenus Giovannolaia.

Like all Plasmodium species P. octamerium has both vertebrate and insect hosts. The vertebrate hosts for this parasite are birds.

== Taxonomy ==
The parasite was first described by Manwell in 1968.

== Distribution ==
This species was described in Africa and has also been reported in Hong Kong.

== Hosts ==
Known hosts for this parasite include the pintail whydah bird (Vidua macroura) and the greater blue-eared glossy starling (Lamprotornis chalybaeus).
