= Plasmodium voltaicum =

Scientific classification
- Domain: Eukaryota
- Clade: Sar
- Clade: Alveolata
- Phylum: Apicomplexa
- Class: Aconoidasida
- Order: Haemospororida
- Family: Plasmodiidae
- Genus: Plasmodium
- Species: P. voltaicum

Binomial name
- Plasmodium voltaicum Van Der Kaay, 1964

Species of single-celled organism

Plasmodium voltaicum is a parasite of the genus Plasmodium subgenus Vinckeia. As in all Plasmodium species, P. voltaicum has both vertebrate and insect hosts. The vertebrate hosts for this parasite are mammals.

== Taxonomy ==
The parasite was first described by Van Der Kaay in 1964.

== Distribution ==
This species is found in Congo-Brazzaville and Ghana.

== Hosts ==
The only known host is the fruit bat Roussettus smithi.
