= Plasmodium brodeni =

Scientific classification
- Domain: Eukaryota
- Clade: Sar
- Clade: Alveolata
- Phylum: Apicomplexa
- Class: Aconoidasida
- Order: Haemospororida
- Family: Plasmodiidae
- Genus: Plasmodium
- Species: P. brodeni

Binomial name
- Plasmodium brodeni Rodhain at al., 1913

Species of single-celled organism

Plasmodium brodeni is a parasite of the genus Plasmodium subgenus Vinckeia. As in all Plasmodium species, P. brodeni has both vertebrate and insect hosts. The vertebrate hosts for this parasite are mammals.

== Taxonomy ==
The parasite was first described by Rodhain at al. in 1913.

== Distribution ==
This species is found in the Congo, Sudan and probably in other parts of Africa.

== Hosts ==
The only known host is the elephant shrew (Petrodomus and Elephantulus species).
