= Plasmodium accipiteris =

Scientific classification
- Domain: Eukaryota
- Clade: Sar
- Clade: Alveolata
- Phylum: Apicomplexa
- Class: Aconoidasida
- Order: Haemospororida
- Family: Plasmodiidae
- Genus: Plasmodium
- Species: P. accipiteris

Binomial name
- Plasmodium accipiteris Paperna et al., 2007

Species of single-celled organism

Plasmodium accipiteris is a parasite of the genus Plasmodium.

Like all Plasmodium species P. accipiteris has both vertebrate and insect hosts. The vertebrate hosts for this parasite are birds.

== Taxonomy ==
The parasite was first described by Paperna et al. in 2007.

== Distribution ==
This parasite is found in Israel.

== Vectors ==
Not known.

== Hostsy ==
P. accipiteris infects the Levant sparrowhawk (Accipiter brevipes).
