= Plasmodium cercopitheci =

Scientific classification
- Domain: Eukaryota
- Clade: Sar
- Clade: Alveolata
- Phylum: Apicomplexa
- Class: Aconoidasida
- Order: Haemospororida
- Family: Plasmodiidae
- Genus: Plasmodium
- Species: P. cercopitheci

Binomial name
- Plasmodium cercopitheci Thieler, 1930

Species of single-celled organism

Plasmodium cercopitheci is a parasite of the genus Plasmodium (subgenus Vinckeia) which infects the monkey Cercopithecis nictitans. The insect host of P. cercopitheci is unknown.

== Taxonomy ==
The parasite was first described by Thieler in 1930.

== Hosts ==
The only known host for this species is the monkey Cercopithecis nictitans.
