= Plasmodium sandoshami =

Scientific classification
- Domain: Eukaryota
- Clade: Diaphoretickes
- Clade: SAR
- Clade: Alveolata
- Phylum: Apicomplexa
- Class: Aconoidasida
- Order: Haemospororida
- Family: Plasmodiidae
- Genus: Plasmodium
- Species: P. sandoshami

Binomial name
- Plasmodium sandoshami Dunn et al., 1963

Species of single-celled organism

Plasmodium sandoshami is a parasite of the genus Plasmodium subgenus Vinckeia. As in all Plasmodium species, P. sandoshami has both vertebrate and insect hosts. The vertebrate hosts for this parasite are mammals.

== Taxonomy ==
The parasite was first described by Dunn et al. in 1963.

This species was named after A. A. Sandosham, Department of Parasitology, Faculty of Medicine in Singapore, University of Malaya.

== Distribution ==
This species is found in Malaysia.

== Hosts ==
The only known host is the Sunda flying lemur (Galeopterus variegatus).
