= Plasmodium incertae =

Scientific classification
- Domain: Eukaryota
- Clade: Sar
- Clade: Alveolata
- Phylum: Apicomplexa
- Class: Aconoidasida
- Order: Haemospororida
- Family: Plasmodiidae
- Genus: Plasmodium
- Species: P. incertae

Binomial name
- Plasmodium incertae

Species of single-celled organism

Plasmodium incertae is a parasite of the genus Plasmodium, subgenus Vinckeia. As in all Plasmodium species, P. incertae has both vertebrate and insect hosts. The vertebrate hosts for this parasite are mammals.

== Distribution ==
This species occurs in Asia.

== Vectors ==
Not known.

== Hosts ==
This species infects Asian flying squirrels.
