= Plasmodium elongatum =

Scientific classification
- Domain: Eukaryota
- Clade: Sar
- Clade: Alveolata
- Phylum: Apicomplexa
- Class: Aconoidasida
- Order: Haemospororida
- Family: Plasmodiidae
- Genus: Plasmodium
- Species: P. elongatum

Binomial name
- Plasmodium elongatum Huff, 1930

Species of parasitic protist that can cause malaria

Plasmodium elongatum is a malaria parasite discovered by Hartman and first disclosed in Hartman 1927. Study of it has been fundamental to understanding the lifecycle of malaria along with study of P. gallinaceum, also a malaria parasite of birds. It is the type species of the subgenus Huffia.
