= Plasmodium papernai =

Scientific classification
- Domain: Eukaryota
- Clade: Sar
- Clade: Alveolata
- Phylum: Apicomplexa
- Class: Aconoidasida
- Order: Haemospororida
- Family: Plasmodiidae
- Genus: Plasmodium
- Species: P. papernai

Binomial name
- Plasmodium papernai Grès and Landau, 1997

Species of single-celled organism

Plasmodium papernai is a parasite of the genus Plasmodium subgenus Novyella. As in all Plasmodium species, P. papernai has both vertebrate and insect hosts. The vertebrate hosts for this parasite are birds.

== Taxonomy ==
The parasite was first described by Grès and Landau in 1997.
