= Plasmodium acuminatum =

Scientific classification
- Domain: Eukaryota
- Clade: Sar
- Clade: Alveolata
- Phylum: Apicomplexa
- Class: Aconoidasida
- Order: Haemospororida
- Family: Plasmodiidae
- Genus: Plasmodium
- Species: P. acuminatum

Binomial name
- Plasmodium acuminatum Pringle, 1960

Species of single-celled organism

Plasmodium acuminatum is a species in the genus Plasmodium subgenus Lacertamoeba.

This species is a protozoan parasite which infects reptiles. Originally described in 1960 infecting Chamaeleo fischeri in Tanzania, this species has not been observed since. As such, little is known about the life cycle and prevalence of the parasite, and its insect host has not been identified.

== Description ==
Plasmodium acuminatum was described by Pringle in 1960, and has not been described since. Parasites were described as having distinctive pointed cytoplasmic projections at either end of the cell. Schizonts contain 6 to 9 nuclei.

== Hosts ==
The only known host of P. acuminatum is the Fisher's chameleon (Chamaeleo fischeri). The insect host is not known.

== Geographical occurrence ==
Plasmodium acuminatum was originally isolated from the Tanga Region, Tanzania.
