= Plasmodium colombiense =

Scientific classification
- Domain: Eukaryota
- Clade: Sar
- Clade: Alveolata
- Phylum: Apicomplexa
- Class: Aconoidasida
- Order: Haemospororida
- Family: Plasmodiidae
- Genus: Plasmodium
- Species: P. colombiense

Binomial name
- Plasmodium colombiense Ayala and Spain, 1976

Species of single-celled organism

Plasmodium colombiense is a parasite of the genus Plasmodium.

Like all Plasmodium species P. colombiense has both vertebrate and insect hosts. The vertebrate hosts for this parasite are reptiles.

== Description ==
The parasite was first described by Ayala and Spain in 1976.

== Geographical occurrence ==
This species is found in Venezuela.

== Clinical features and host pathology ==
The only known host of this parasite is the iguanid lizard Anolis auratus.
