= Plasmodium achromaticum =

Scientific classification
- Domain: Eukaryota
- Clade: Sar
- Clade: Alveolata
- Phylum: Apicomplexa
- Class: Aconoidasida
- Order: Haemospororida
- Family: Plasmodiidae
- Genus: Plasmodium
- Species: P. achromaticum

Binomial name
- Plasmodium achromaticum Yakimoff and Stolinikoff, 1912

Species of single-celled organism

Plasmodium achromaticum is a parasite of the genus Plasmodium subgenus Vinckeia.

As in all Plasmodium species, P. achromaticum has both vertebrate and insect hosts. The vertebrate hosts for this parasite are mammals.

== Taxonomy ==
The parasite was first described by Yakimoff and Stolinikoff in 1912.

== Vectors ==
Not known.

== Hosts ==
The only known host for this species is the bat Achromaticum versperuginus.
