= Plasmodium neusticuri =

Scientific classification
- Domain: Eukaryota
- Clade: Sar
- Clade: Alveolata
- Phylum: Apicomplexa
- Class: Aconoidasida
- Order: Haemospororida
- Family: Plasmodiidae
- Genus: Plasmodium
- Species: P. neusticuri

Binomial name
- Plasmodium neusticuri Lainson and Paperna, 1996

Species of single-celled organism

Plasmodium neusticuri is a parasite of the genus Plasmodium.

Like all Plasmodium species, P. neusticuri has both vertebrate and insect hosts. Its vertebrate hosts are reptiles.

== Description ==
This species infects the lizard Neusticurus bicarinatus.

Blood stages of the parasite are described to occupy at one pole of the host cell. Infection does not enlarge or distort the host red blood cells. Each infected cell generally yields 4 to 8 new merozoites. Gametocytes are "kidney-shaped" and are smaller than the host cell nucleus.

== Geographical occurrence ==
This species is found in Brazil in the Amazon area.

== Hosts ==
Plasmodium neusticuri has only been described from the blood of N. bicarinatus. It is not clear if P. neusticuri causes disease symptoms in this host.
