= Plasmodium lutzi =

Scientific classification
- Domain: Eukaryota
- Clade: Sar
- Clade: Alveolata
- Phylum: Apicomplexa
- Class: Aconoidasida
- Order: Haemospororida
- Family: Plasmodiidae
- Genus: Plasmodium
- Species: P. lutzi

Binomial name
- Plasmodium lutzi Lucena, 1939

Species of single-celled organism

Plasmodium lutzi is a parasite of the genus Plasmodium subgenus Haemamoeba.

Like all Plasmodium species P. lutzi has both vertebrate and insect hosts. The vertebrate hosts for this parasite are birds.

== Taxonomy ==
The parasite was first described by Lucena in 1939.

== Distribution ==
This parasite is found in Brazil, Colombia and Venezuela.

== Hosts ==
This parasite has been reported to infect the grey-cowled wood rail (Aramides cajaneus) and the great thrush (Turdus fuscater).
