= Plasmodium bucki =

Scientific classification
- Domain: Eukaryota
- Clade: Sar
- Clade: Alveolata
- Phylum: Apicomplexa
- Class: Aconoidasida
- Order: Haemospororida
- Family: Plasmodiidae
- Genus: Plasmodium
- Species: P. bucki

Binomial name
- Plasmodium bucki Landau et al., 1989

Species of single-celled organism

Plasmodium bucki is a parasite of the genus Plasmodium subgenus Vinckeia.As in all Plasmodium species, P. bucki has both vertebrate and insect hosts. The vertebrate hosts for this parasite are mammals.

== Description ==
The parasite was first described by Landau et al. in 1989.

The infected erythrocyte becomes enlarged and stippled. The stippling resembles Maurer's dots.

The mature schizonts produce 32 merozoites.

== Distribution ==
This species is found in Madagascar.

== Hosts ==
The only known host is the lemur Lemur macaco macaco.
