= Plasmodium japonicum =

Scientific classification
- Domain: Eukaryota
- Clade: Sar
- Clade: Alveolata
- Phylum: Apicomplexa
- Class: Aconoidasida
- Order: Haemospororida
- Family: Plasmodiidae
- Genus: Plasmodium
- Species: P. japonicum

Binomial name
- Plasmodium japonicum Ishiguro, 1957

Species of single-celled organism

Plasmodium japonicum is a parasite of the genus Plasmodium.

Like all Plasmodium species P. japonicum has both vertebrate and insect hosts. The vertebrate hosts for this parasite are birds.

== Description ==
The parasite was first described by Ishiguro in 1957.
