= Plasmodium tyrio =

Scientific classification
- Domain: Eukaryota
- Clade: Sar
- Clade: Alveolata
- Phylum: Apicomplexa
- Class: Aconoidasida
- Order: Haemospororida
- Family: Plasmodiidae
- Genus: Plasmodium
- Species: P. tyrio

Binomial name
- Plasmodium tyrio de Mello et al., 1928

Species of single-celled organism

Plasmodium tyrio is a parasite of the genus Plasmodium. As in all Plasmodium species, P. tyrio has both vertebrate and insect hosts. Its only known vertebrate host is the Chinese pangolin.

== Taxonomy ==
The parasite was first described by de Mello, Fernandes, Correia and Lobo in 1928.

== Hosts ==
The only known host of this species is the Chinese pangolin (Manis pentadactyla).
