= Plasmodium draconis =

Scientific classification
- Domain: Eukaryota
- Clade: Sar
- Clade: Alveolata
- Phylum: Apicomplexa
- Class: Aconoidasida
- Order: Haemospororida
- Family: Plasmodiidae
- Genus: Plasmodium
- Species: P. draconis

Binomial name
- Plasmodium draconis Telford, 1995

Species of single-celled organism

Plasmodium draconis is a species of apicomplexan parasite in the family Plasmodiidae.

Like all Plasmodium species P. draconis has both vertebrate and insect hosts. The vertebrate hosts for this parasite are reptiles.

== Description ==
The parasite was first described by Telford in 1995.

The schizonts produce 4–16 merozoites.

== Distribution ==
This species is found in the Philippines and Sarawak (Malaysia).

== Hosts ==
The only known host of this species is the flying lizard Draco volans.
