= Plasmodium hydrochaeri =

Scientific classification
- Domain: Eukaryota
- Clade: Sar
- Clade: Alveolata
- Phylum: Apicomplexa
- Class: Aconoidasida
- Order: Haemospororida
- Family: Plasmodiidae
- Genus: Plasmodium
- Species: P. hydrochaeri

Binomial name
- Plasmodium hydrochaeri Dos Santos et al. 2009

Species of single-celled organism

Plasmodium hydrochaeri is a parasite of the genus Plasmodium subgenus Vinckeia.

Like all Plasmodium species P. hydrochaeri has both vertebrate and insect hosts. The vertebrate hosts for this parasite are rodents.

== Description ==
This species was provisionally named in 2009 by Dos Santos et al.

The only known host is the capybara (Hydrochaeris hydrochaeris).

== Geographical occurrence ==
This species is found in South America. It has only been described in captive capybaras at the Sanctuary Zoo in Brazil.

== Hosts and disease ==
P. hydrochaeri was isolated from capybara with no clinical signs of disease, suggesting that the parasite causes little to no disease in this host.
