= Plasmodium bouillize =

Scientific classification
- Domain: Eukaryota
- Clade: Sar
- Clade: Alveolata
- Phylum: Apicomplexa
- Class: Aconoidasida
- Order: Haemospororida
- Family: Plasmodiidae
- Genus: Plasmodium
- Species: P. bouillize

Binomial name
- Plasmodium bouillize Ledger, 1922

Species of single-celled organism

Plasmodium bouillize is a parasite of the genus Plasmodium and subgenus Vinckeia. As in all Plasmodium species, P. bouillize has both vertebrate and insect hosts. The vertebrate hosts for this parasite are mammals.

== Taxonomy ==
Plasmodium bouillize was first described by Ledger in 1922.

== Hosts ==
Plasmodium bouillize's only known host is the monkey Cercopithecus campbelli.
