= Plasmodium melanipherum =

Scientific classification
- Domain: Eukaryota
- Clade: Sar
- Clade: Alveolata
- Phylum: Apicomplexa
- Class: Aconoidasida
- Order: Haemospororida
- Family: Plasmodiidae
- Genus: Plasmodium
- Species: P. melanipherum

Binomial name
- Plasmodium melanipherum Dionisi, 1899

Species of single-celled organism

Plasmodium melanipherum is a parasite of the genus Plasmodium subgenus Vinckeia. As in all Plasmodium species, P. melanipherum has both vertebrate and insect hosts. The vertebrate hosts for this parasite are mammals.

== Taxonomy ==
This species was first described by Dionisi in 1899. A subspecies (P. melanipherum monosoma) was later described by Vassal in 1907. P. melanipherum was described to resemble Plasmodium malariae.

== Distribution ==
P. melanipherum has only been described in Central Africa.

== Hosts ==
P. melanipherum infects Schreibers' bat (Miniopterus schreibersii). P. melanipherum monosoma infects the bat Vesperugo abramus. It is not known if these parasites cause disease in their bat hosts.
