= Plasmodium caprae =

Scientific classification
- Domain: Eukaryota
- Clade: Sar
- Clade: Alveolata
- Phylum: Apicomplexa
- Class: Aconoidasida
- Order: Haemospororida
- Family: Plasmodiidae
- Genus: Plasmodium
- Species: P. caprae

Binomial name
- Plasmodium caprae de Mello and Paes, 1923

Species of single-celled organism

Plasmodium caprae is a parasite of the genus Plasmodium subgenus Vinckeia.

Like all Plasmodium species P. caprae has both vertebrate and insect hosts. The vertebrate hosts for this parasite are domestic goats, Capra aegagrus. The specific epithet for P. caprae, "caprae," comes from the genus name, "Capra," for the goat.

== Taxonomy ==
The parasite was first described by de Mello and Paes in 1923.

It was originally classified as Laverania caprae. Laverania is now recognised as a subgenus of Plasmodium and the correct current designation is Plasmodium caprae.

== Distribution ==
This species was described in Angola.
