= Plasmodium alloelongatum =

Scientific classification
- Domain: Eukaryota
- Clade: Diaphoretickes
- Clade: SAR
- Clade: Alveolata
- Phylum: Apicomplexa
- Class: Aconoidasida
- Order: Haemospororida
- Family: Plasmodiidae
- Genus: Plasmodium
- Species: P. alloelongatum

Binomial name
- Plasmodium alloelongatum Paperna et al., 2007

Species of single-celled organism

Plasmodium alloelongatum is a parasite of the genus Plasmodium.

Like all Plasmodium species P. alloelongatum has both vertebrate and insect hosts. The vertebrate hosts for this parasite are birds.

== Description ==
The parasite was first described by Paperna et al. in 2007.

== Geographical occurrence ==
This parasite is found in Israel.

== Clinical features and host pathology ==
Plasmodium alloelongatum infects the Levant sparrowhawk (Accipiter brevipes).
