= Plasmodium landauae =

Scientific classification
- Domain: Eukaryota
- Clade: Sar
- Clade: Alveolata
- Phylum: Apicomplexa
- Class: Aconoidasida
- Order: Haemospororida
- Family: Plasmodiidae
- Genus: Plasmodium
- Species: P. landauae

Binomial name
- Plasmodium landauae Killick-Kendrick, 1973

Species of single-celled organism

Plasmodium landauae is a parasite of the genus Plasmodium subgenus Vinckeia. As in all Plasmodium species, P. landauae has both vertebrate and insect hosts. The vertebrate hosts for this parasite are mammals.

== Description ==
P. landauae was described from the blood of flying squirrels.

== Distribution ==
P. landauae has only been described in the Ivory Coast.

== Hosts ==
P. landauae was described from blood of the flying squirrel Anomalurus peli. The squirrel showed no signs of disease at the time, suggesting P. landauae may not cause severe disease in this host.
