= Plasmodium traguli =

Scientific classification
- Domain: Eukaryota
- Clade: Sar
- Clade: Alveolata
- Phylum: Apicomplexa
- Class: Aconoidasida
- Order: Haemospororida
- Family: Plasmodiidae
- Genus: Plasmodium
- Species: P. traguli

Binomial name
- Plasmodium traguli Garnham and Edeson, 1962

Species of single-celled organism

Plasmodium traguli is a parasite of the genus Plasmodium subgenus Vinckeia. As in all Plasmodium species, P. traguli has both vertebrate and insect hosts. This particular species infects mouse deer in Southeast Asia.

== Taxonomy ==
The parasite was first described by Garnham and Edeson in 1962.

== Distribution ==
This parasite is found in Malaysia and Sri Lanka.

== Vectors ==
Anopheles baezai, Anopheles letifer, Anopheles maculatus, Anopheles roperi and Anopheles umbrosus are known vectors.

Mansonia crassipes may be a vector.

== Hosts ==
This species infects the mouse deer (Tragulus javanicus).
