= Plasmodium semnopitheci =

Scientific classification
- Domain: Eukaryota
- Clade: Sar
- Clade: Alveolata
- Phylum: Apicomplexa
- Class: Aconoidasida
- Order: Haemospororida
- Family: Plasmodiidae
- Genus: Plasmodium
- Species: P. semnopitheci

Binomial name
- Plasmodium semnopitheci Knowles, 1919

Species of single-celled organism

Plasmodium semnopitheci is a parasite of the genus Plasmodium and subgenus Vinckeia. As in all Plasmodium species, P. semnopitheci has both vertebrate and insect hosts. P. semnopitheci was isolated from a monkey.

== Taxonomy ==
The parasite was first described by Knowles in 1919.

== Hosts ==
The only known host of this species is the northern plains gray langur (Semnopithecus entellus).
