= Plasmodium audaciosum =

Scientific classification
- Domain: Eukaryota
- Clade: Diaphoretickes
- Clade: SAR
- Clade: Alveolata
- Phylum: Apicomplexa
- Class: Aconoidasida
- Order: Haemospororida
- Family: Plasmodiidae
- Genus: Plasmodium
- Species: P. audaciosum

Binomial name
- Plasmodium audaciosum Lainson, Shaw and Landau, 1975

Species of single-celled organism

Plasmodium audaciosum is a parasite of the genus Plasmodium.

Like all Plasmodium species P. audaciosum has both vertebrate and insect hosts. The vertebrate hosts for this parasite are reptiles.

== Description ==
This organism was described by Lainson, Shaw and Landau in 1975.

== Geographical occurrence ==
This species is found in Brazil.

== Clinical features and host pathology ==
The only known host is the South American 'chameleon' (Plica umbra).
