= Plasmodium cephalophi =

Scientific classification
- Domain: Eukaryota
- Clade: Sar
- Clade: Alveolata
- Phylum: Apicomplexa
- Class: Aconoidasida
- Order: Haemospororida
- Family: Plasmodiidae
- Genus: Plasmodium
- Species: P. cephalophi

Binomial name
- Plasmodium cephalophi Bruce et al., 1913

Species of single-celled organism

Plasmodium cephalophi is a parasite of the genus Plasmodium subgenus Vinckeia. As in all Plasmodium species, P. cephalophi has both vertebrate and insect hosts. The vertebrate hosts for this parasite are mammals.

== Taxonomy ==
The parasite was first described by Bruce et al. in 1913.

== Description ==
The schizonts give rise to 8-12 merozoites. Mature merozoites measure 10 x 10 micrometres.

The merozoites are large measuring 3.5 by 4.0 micrometres.

The gametocytes are round and possess a number of darkly staining granules.

The infected erythrocytes are pale.

== Distribution ==
This species was described in Malawi.

== Hosts ==
The parasite was found in the blood of two antelopes (Cephalophus grimmi).

It is also known to infect the grey duiker (Sylvicapra grimmia)
