= Plasmodium inopinatum =

Scientific classification
- Domain: Eukaryota
- Clade: Sar
- Clade: Alveolata
- Phylum: Apicomplexa
- Class: Aconoidasida
- Order: Haemospororida
- Family: Plasmodiidae
- Genus: Plasmodium
- Species: P. inopinatum

Binomial name
- Plasmodium inopinatum Resseler, 1952

Species of single-celled organism

Plasmodium inopinatum is a parasite of the genus Plasmodium subgenus Vinckeia. As in all Plasmodium species, P. inopinatum has both vertebrate and insect hosts. The vertebrate hosts for this parasite are mammals.

== Taxonomy ==
The parasite was first described by Resseler in 1952.

== Distribution ==
This species was described in Belgium.
