= Plasmodium joyeuxi =

Scientific classification
- Domain: Eukaryota
- Clade: Sar
- Clade: Alveolata
- Phylum: Apicomplexa
- Class: Aconoidasida
- Order: Haemospororida
- Family: Plasmodiidae
- Genus: Plasmodium
- Species: P. joyeuxi

Binomial name
- Plasmodium joyeuxi Ledger, 1928

Species of single-celled organism

Plasmodium joyeuxi is a parasite of the genus Plasmodium subgenus Vinckeia. As in Plasmodium species, P. joyeuxi has both vertebrate and insect hosts. The vertebrate hosts for this parasite are mammals.

== Taxonomy ==
The parasite was first described by Ledger in 1928.

== Hosts ==
The only known host for this species is the monkey Cercopithecis callitricus.
