= Plasmodium attenuatum =

Scientific classification
- Domain: Eukaryota
- Clade: Sar
- Clade: Alveolata
- Phylum: Apicomplexa
- Class: Aconoidasida
- Order: Haemospororida
- Family: Plasmodiidae
- Genus: Plasmodium
- Species: P. attenuatum

Binomial name
- Plasmodium attenuatum Telford, 1973

Species of single-celled organism

Plasmodium attenuatum is a parasite of the genus Plasmodium subgenus Carinamoeba.

Like all Plasmodium species P. attenuatum has both vertebrate and insect hosts. The vertebrate hosts for this parasite are reptiles.

== Taxonomy ==
The parasite was first described by Telford in 1973.

== Distribution ==
This species is found in Venezuela.

== Hosts ==
This species infects the lizard Ameiva ameiva.
