= Plasmodium vautieri =

Scientific classification
- Domain: Eukaryota
- Clade: Sar
- Clade: Alveolata
- Phylum: Apicomplexa
- Class: Aconoidasida
- Order: Haemospororida
- Family: Plasmodiidae
- Genus: Plasmodium
- Species: P. vautieri

Binomial name
- Plasmodium vautieri Pessoa and de Blasi, 1973

Species of single-celled organism

Plasmodium vautieri is a parasite of the genus Plasmodium subgenus Lacertamoeba. As in all species of the genus Plasmodium, P. vautieri has both vertebrate and insect hosts. The vertebrate hosts for this parasite are reptiles.

== Taxonomy ==
The parasite was first described by Pessoa and de Blasi in 1973.

== Description ==
The meronts give rise to 10-20 merozoites arranged in a rosette.

The meronts measure 4.8 - 7.5 x 3.5 - 6.0 microns.

Pigment granules are occur either as a central mass or at the edge of the cell.

The gametocytes are ovoid. There is no apparent difference between the male and female gametocytes.

The gametocytes measure 5.0 - 7.5 x 3.0 - 4.0

== Distribution ==
This species is found in Brazil, South America.

== Hosts ==
The only known host is the lizard Urostrophus vautieri.
