= Plasmodium bubalis =

Scientific classification
- Domain: Eukaryota
- Clade: Sar
- Clade: Alveolata
- Phylum: Apicomplexa
- Class: Aconoidasida
- Order: Haemospororida
- Family: Plasmodiidae
- Genus: Plasmodium
- Species: P. bubalis

Binomial name
- Plasmodium bubalis Sheather, 1919

Species of single-celled organism

Plasmodium bubalis is a parasite of the genus Plasmodium (subgenus Vinckeia) which causes malaria in buffalo in India.

== Description ==
Like other Plasmodium species, P. bubalis infects the red blood cells of its mammalian host. In the red blood cells, the parasite has several stages. The trophozoite stages begin as amoeboid in shape and measuring 1.2 to 1.8 μm. Larger trophozoites appear spherical and can measure up to 5.0 μm. Gametocytes occupy the entire red blood cell, and measure 6 to 8 μm in diameter.

== Role in disease ==
P. bubalis causes malaria in buffalo. Infected buffalo show fever and decreased appetite, as well as anemia, pale mucous membranes, and reduced rumen motility.

== History ==
The parasite was first described by Sheather in 1919 in buffalo (Bubalus bubalis) in India. Since then there have been a small number of case reports also describing P. bubalis infections of buffalo.
