= Plasmodium iguanae =

Scientific classification
- Domain: Eukaryota
- Clade: Sar
- Clade: Alveolata
- Phylum: Apicomplexa
- Class: Aconoidasida
- Order: Haemospororida
- Family: Plasmodiidae
- Genus: Plasmodium
- Species: P. iguanae

Binomial name
- Plasmodium iguanae Telford, 1980

Species of single-celled organism

Plasmodium iguanae is a parasite of the genus Plasmodium.

Like all Plasmodium species P. iguanae has both vertebrate and insect hosts. The vertebrate hosts for this parasite are reptiles.

== Description ==
The parasite was first described by Telford in 1980.

== Geographical occurrence ==
This species is found in Venezuela.

== Clinical features and host pathology ==
The only known host species is the Green Iguana lizard Iguana iguana.
