= Plasmodium cordyli =

Scientific classification
- Domain: Eukaryota
- Clade: Sar
- Clade: Alveolata
- Phylum: Apicomplexa
- Class: Aconoidasida
- Order: Haemospororida
- Family: Plasmodiidae
- Genus: Plasmodium
- Species: P. cordyli

Binomial name
- Plasmodium cordyli Telford, 1987

Species of single-celled organism

Plasmodium achiotense is a parasite of the genus Plasmodium subgenus Carinamoeba.

Like all Plasmodium species P. cordyli has both vertebrate and insect hosts. The vertebrate hosts for this parasite are reptiles.

== Description ==
The parasite was first described by Telford in 1987.

== Geographical occurrence ==
This species is found in Africa.

== Clinical features and host pathology ==
This species infects cordylid lizards.
