= Plasmodium bigueti =

Scientific classification
- Domain: Eukaryota
- Clade: Sar
- Clade: Alveolata
- Phylum: Apicomplexa
- Class: Aconoidasida
- Order: Haemospororida
- Family: Plasmodiidae
- Genus: Plasmodium
- Species: P. bigueti

Binomial name
- Plasmodium bigueti Landau et al., 2003

Species of single-celled organism

Plasmodium bigueti is a parasite of the genus Plasmodium.

Like all Plasmodium species P. bigueti has both vertebrate and insect hosts. The vertebrate hosts for this parasite are birds.

== Description ==
The parasite was first described by Landau et al. in 2003.

== Geographical occurrence ==
This species was described in France.

== Clinical features and host pathology ==
The only known host is the sparrow (Passer domesticus).
