= Plasmodium auffenbergi =

Scientific classification
- Domain: Eukaryota
- Clade: Sar
- Clade: Alveolata
- Phylum: Apicomplexa
- Class: Aconoidasida
- Order: Haemospororida
- Family: Plasmodiidae
- Genus: Plasmodium
- Species: P. auffenbergi

Binomial name
- Plasmodium auffenbergi Telford, 2016

Species of single-celled organism

Plasmodium auffenbergi is a parasite of the genus Plasmodium subgenus Carinamoeba.

Like all Plasmodium species P. auffenbergi has both vertebrate and insect hosts. The vertebrate hosts for this parasite are reptiles.

== Taxonomy ==
The parasite was first described by Telford in 2016

The meronts are cruciform or fan shaped. They measure 3.0 x 2.2 microns. They produce 2-5 merozoites.

The gametocytes are spherical to ovoid and measure 4.7 x 3.9 microns. Male and female gametocytes do not differ in size or morphology.

== Distribution ==
This species is found in the Philippines.

== Hosts ==
This species infects the peacock monitor (Varanus auffenbergi). This lizard is also known as Auffenberg's monitor.
