= Plasmodium tumbayaensis =

Scientific classification
- Domain: Eukaryota
- Clade: Sar
- Clade: Alveolata
- Phylum: Apicomplexa
- Class: Aconoidasida
- Order: Haemospororida
- Family: Plasmodiidae
- Genus: Plasmodium
- Species: P. tumbayaensis

Binomial name
- Plasmodium tumbayaensis Mazza and Fiori, 1930

Species of single-celled organism

Plasmodium tumbayaensis is a parasite of the genus Plasmodium.

Like all Plasmodium species P. tumbayaensis has both vertebrate and insect hosts. The vertebrate hosts for this parasite are birds.

== Description ==
The parasite was first described by Mazza and Fiora in 1930.

== Clinical features and host pathology ==
The only known host of this species is the thrush Planethicus anthracinus.
