= Plasmodium unalis =

Scientific classification
- Domain: Eukaryota
- Clade: Sar
- Clade: Alveolata
- Phylum: Apicomplexa
- Class: Aconoidasida
- Order: Haemospororida
- Family: Plasmodiidae
- Genus: Plasmodium
- Subgenus: Novyella
- Species: P. unalis

Binomial name
- Plasmodium unalis Mantilla et al, 2013

Species of single-celled organism

Plasmodium unalis is a parasite of the genus Plasmodium subgenus Novyella. As in all Plasmodium species, P. unalis has both vertebrate and insect hosts. The vertebrate hosts for this parasite are birds.

== Taxonomy ==
It was described in 2013 by Mantilla et al.

== Distribution ==
This species occurs in Colombia. It may also be present in other countries in Americas.

== Hosts ==
This species infects the great thrush (Turdus fuscater).
