= Plasmodium venkataramiahii =

Scientific classification
- Domain: Eukaryota
- Clade: Sar
- Clade: Alveolata
- Phylum: Apicomplexa
- Class: Aconoidasida
- Order: Haemospororida
- Family: Plasmodiidae
- Genus: Plasmodium
- Species: P. venkataramiahii

Binomial name
- Plasmodium venkataramiahii

Species of single-celled organism

Plasmodium venkataramiahii is a parasite of the genus Plasmodium.

Like all Plasmodium species P. venkataramiahii has both vertebrate and insect hosts. The vertebrate hosts for this parasite are birds.

== Clinical features and host pathology ==
This species infects crows (Corvus splendens).
