= Plasmodium icipeensis =

Scientific classification
- Domain: Eukaryota
- Clade: Sar
- Clade: Alveolata
- Phylum: Apicomplexa
- Class: Aconoidasida
- Order: Haemospororida
- Family: Plasmodiidae
- Genus: Plasmodium
- Species: P. icipeensis

Binomial name
- Plasmodium icipeensis Dipeolu and Mutinga, 1989

Species of single-celled organism

Plasmodium icipeensis is a parasite of the genus Plasmodium.

Like all Plasmodium species P. achiotense has both vertebrate and insect hosts. The vertebrate hosts for this parasite are lizards.

== Geographical occurrence ==
This species is found in Kenya.
