= Plasmodium circularis =

Scientific classification
- Domain: Eukaryota
- Clade: Sar
- Clade: Alveolata
- Phylum: Apicomplexa
- Class: Aconoidasida
- Order: Haemospororida
- Family: Plasmodiidae
- Genus: Plasmodium
- Species: P. circularis

Binomial name
- Plasmodium circularis Telford and Stein, 2000

Species of single-celled organism

Plasmodium circularis is a parasite of the genus Plasmodium subgenus Sauramoeba.

Like all Plasmodium species P. circularis has both vertebrate and insect hosts. The vertebrate hosts for this parasite are reptiles.

== Description ==
The parasite was first described by Telford and Stein in 2000.

== Geographical occurrence ==
This species is found in Australia and infects the Australian skink Egernia stokesii.
