= Plasmodium globularis =

Scientific classification
- Domain: Eukaryota
- Clade: Diaphoretickes
- Clade: SAR
- Clade: Alveolata
- Phylum: Apicomplexa
- Class: Aconoidasida
- Order: Haemospororida
- Family: Plasmodiidae
- Genus: Plasmodium
- Species: P. globularis

Binomial name
- Plasmodium globularis Valkiūnas et al., 2008

Species of single-celled organism

Plasmodium globularis is a parasite of the genus Plasmodium subgenus Novyella. As in all Plasmodium species, P. globularis has both vertebrate and insect hosts. The vertebrate hosts for this parasite are birds.

== Taxonomy ==
The parasite was first described by Valkiūnas et al. in 2008.

== Distribution ==
This parasite is found in Ghana and Cameroon.

== Hosts ==
P. globularis infects the yellow-whiskered greenbul (Andropadus latirostris).
