= Plasmodium mabuiae =

Scientific classification
- Domain: Eukaryota
- Clade: Sar
- Clade: Alveolata
- Phylum: Apicomplexa
- Class: Aconoidasida
- Order: Haemospororida
- Family: Plasmodiidae
- Genus: Plasmodium
- Species: P. mabuiae

Binomial name
- Plasmodium mabuiae Weyon, 1909

Species of single-celled organism

Plasmodium mabuiae is a parasite of the genus Plasmodium subgenus Carinamoeba.

Like all Plasmodium species P. mabuiae has both vertebrate and insect hosts. The vertebrate hosts for this parasite are reptiles.

== Taxonomy ==
This species was first described by Weyon in 1909 in Sudan.

== Description ==
The schizonts are less than or equal to the host cell nucleus in size.

Each schizont produces four to eight merozoites.

The Gametocytes are elongate and equal to or slightly larger than host cell nuclei, and are found diagonally across one end of the host cell.

== Description ==
This species is found in Tanzania (Dar-es-Salaam and Morogoro).

== Hosts ==
This species infects the African striped skink (Mabuya striata).
