= Plasmodium achiotense =

Scientific classification
- Domain: Eukaryota
- Clade: Sar
- Clade: Alveolata
- Phylum: Apicomplexa
- Class: Aconoidasida
- Order: Haemospororida
- Family: Plasmodiidae
- Genus: Plasmodium
- Species: P. achiotense

Binomial name
- Plasmodium achiotense Telford, 1972

Species of single-celled organism

Plasmodium achiotense is a parasite of the genus Plasmodium subgenus Sauramoeba.

As in all Plasmodium species, P. achiotense has both vertebrate and insect hosts. The vertebrate hosts for this parasite are reptiles.

== Taxonomy ==
The parasite was first described by Telford in 1972.

== Description ==
The gametocytes are round to ovoid in shape. They occupy a polar position in the erythrocytes which are enlarged and deformed.

== Vectors ==
Not known.
