= Plasmodium narayani =

Scientific classification
- Domain: Eukaryota
- Clade: Sar
- Clade: Alveolata
- Phylum: Apicomplexa
- Class: Aconoidasida
- Order: Haemospororida
- Family: Plasmodiidae
- Genus: Plasmodium
- Species: P. narayani

Binomial name
- Plasmodium narayani de Mello and Diaz, 1936

Species of single-celled organism

Plasmodium narayani is a parasite of the genus Plasmodium subgenus Vinckeia. As in all Plasmodium species, P. narayani has both vertebrate and insect hosts. The vertebrate hosts for this parasite are mammals.

== Taxonomy ==
The parasite was first described by de Mello and Diaz in 1936.

This parasite has only been described on one occasion. The description is incomplete and this species should be regarded as being of dubious validity until further work has confirmed or refuted these findings.

== Description ==
As described the schizonts were annular and amoeboid and between 1/5 and 1/6 of the erythrocyte in size. Black pigment was seen. 9-11 merozoites per schizont were seen. The gametocytes were oval. No granules or dots were seen in the erythrocytes.

== Distribution ==
This parasite is found in India.

== Vectors ==
Not known.

== Hosts ==
This species infects the otter (Lutea lutra).
