= Plasmodium megaglobularis =

Scientific classification
- Domain: Eukaryota
- Clade: Sar
- Clade: Alveolata
- Phylum: Apicomplexa
- Class: Aconoidasida
- Order: Haemospororida
- Family: Plasmodiidae
- Genus: Plasmodium
- Species: P. megaglobularis

Binomial name
- Plasmodium megaglobularis Valkiūnas et al., 2008

Species of single-celled organism

Plasmodium megaglobularis is a species of malaria-causing parasite in the genus Plasmodium, subgenus Novyella. As in all Plasmodium species, P. megaglobularis has both vertebrate and insect hosts. The vertebrate hosts for this parasite are birds.

== Taxonomy ==
The parasite was first described by Valkiūnas et al. in 2008.

== Distribution ==
This parasite is found in Ghana and Cameroon.

== Hosts ==
P. megaglobularis infects the olive sunbird (Cyanomitra olivacea).
