= Plasmodium saurocaudatum =

Scientific classification
- Domain: Eukaryota
- Clade: Sar
- Clade: Alveolata
- Phylum: Apicomplexa
- Class: Aconoidasida
- Order: Haemospororida
- Family: Plasmodiidae
- Genus: Plasmodium
- Species: P. saurocaudatum

Binomial name
- Plasmodium saurocaudatum Telford, 1983

Species of single-celled organism

Plasmodium saurocaudatum is a parasite of the genus Plasmodium.

== Description ==
Like all Plasmodium species, P. saurocaudatum has both vertebrate and insect hosts. The vertebrate hosts for this parasite are reptiles.

The parasite was first described by Telford in 1983.

== Geographical occurrence ==
This species is found in Southeast Asia.

== Clinical features and host pathology ==
The only known host is the many-lined sun skink (Mabuya multifasciata).
