= Plasmodium fairchildi =

Scientific classification
- Domain: Eukaryota
- Clade: Sar
- Clade: Alveolata
- Phylum: Apicomplexa
- Class: Aconoidasida
- Order: Haemospororida
- Family: Plasmodiidae
- Genus: Plasmodium
- Species: P. fairchildi

Binomial name
- Plasmodium fairchildi Telford, 1989

Species of single-celled organism

Plasmodium fairchildi is a parasite of the genus Plasmodium.

Like all Plasmodium species it has vertebrate and insect hosts. The vertebrate hosts are reptiles. The insect vector is not known.

== Description ==
This species was described by Telford in 1989.

== Geographic occurrence ==
This species has been described in the Caribbean island of Hispaniola.

== Clinical features and host pathology ==
The only known host is the lizard Anolis cupreus.

== Note ==
Two subspecies were recognised Plasmodium fairchildi fairchildi and Plasmodium fairchildi hispaniolae but the latter has been elevated to species level as Plasmodium hispaniolae.
