= Plasmodium gundersi =

Scientific classification
- Domain: Eukaryota
- Clade: Sar
- Clade: Alveolata
- Phylum: Apicomplexa
- Class: Aconoidasida
- Order: Haemospororida
- Family: Plasmodiidae
- Genus: Plasmodium
- Species: P. gundersi

Binomial name
- Plasmodium gundersi Bray, 1962

Species of single-celled organism

Plasmodium gundersi is a parasite of the genus Plasmodium subgenus Giovannolaia.

Like all Plasmodium species P. gundersi has both vertebrate and insect hosts. The vertebrate hosts for this parasite are birds.

== Taxonomy ==
The parasite was first described by Bray in 1962.

== Hosts ==
Vertebrate hosts of this species include the eastern screech owl (Otus asio).
