= Plasmodium beebei =

Scientific classification
- Domain: Eukaryota
- Clade: Sar
- Clade: Alveolata
- Phylum: Apicomplexa
- Class: Aconoidasida
- Order: Haemospororida
- Family: Plasmodiidae
- Genus: Plasmodium
- Species: P. beebei

Binomial name
- Plasmodium beebei Telford, 1978

Species of single-celled organism

Plasmodium beebei is a parasite of the genus Plasmodium subgenus Lacertamoeba.

Like all Plasmodium species P. beebei has both vertebrate and insect hosts. The vertebrate hosts for this parasite are reptiles.

== Description ==
The parasite was first described by Telford in 1978.

== Geographical occurrence ==
This species is found in Venezuela, South America.

== Clinical features and host pathology ==
The only known host is the lizard Gonatodes taniae.
