= Plasmodium delichoni =

Scientific classification
- Domain: Eukaryota
- Clade: Sar
- Clade: Alveolata
- Phylum: Apicomplexa
- Class: Aconoidasida
- Order: Haemospororida
- Family: Plasmodiidae
- Genus: Plasmodium
- Species: P. delichoni

Binomial name
- Plasmodium delichoni Valkiūnas et al., 2008

Species of single-celled organism

Plasmodium delichoni is a parasite of the genus Plasmodium subgenus Novyella.

Like all Plasmodium species, P. delichoni has both vertebrate and insect hosts. The vertebrate hosts for this parasite are birds.

== Taxonomy ==
The parasite was first described by Valkiūnas et al. in 2008.

== Distribution ==
This parasite is found in Europe, Asia and Africa.

== Hosts ==
P. delichoni infects the common house martin (Delichon urbicum).
