= List of Plasmodium species infecting reptiles =

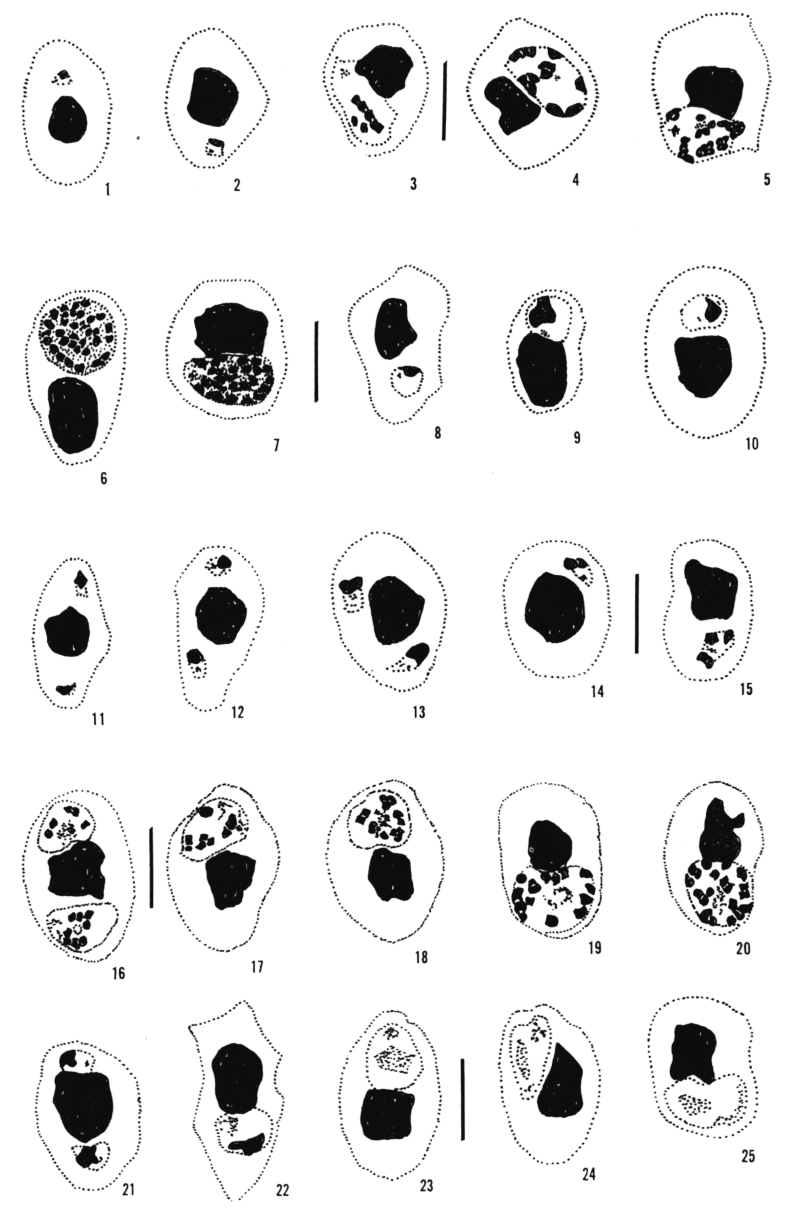
Plasmodium robinsoni

Over 90 species and subspecies of Plasmodium infect lizards. They have been reported from over 3200 species of lizard but only 29 species of snake. Three species - P. pessoai, P. tomodoni and P. wenyoni - infect snakes. These species belong to the subgenera Asiamoeba, Carinamoeba, Fallisia, Garnia, Lacertamoeba, Ophidiella, Paraplasmodium and Sauramoeba. Additional species continue to be described.

== Species ==
Plasmodium achiotense
Plasmodium aeuminatum
Plasmodium agamae
Plasmodium arachniformis
Plasmodium attenuatum
Plasmodium aurulentum
Plasmodium australis
Plasmodium azurophilum
Plasmodium balli
Plasmodium basilisci
Plasmodium beebei
Plasmodium beltrani
Plasmodium brumpti
Plasmodium brygooi
Plasmodium chiricahuae
Plasmodium circularis
Plasmodium cnemaspi
Plasmodium cnemidophori
Plasmodium colombiense
Plasmodium cordyli
Plasmodium diminutivum
Plasmodium diploglossi
Plasmodium egerniae
Plasmodium fairchildi
Plasmodium floridense
Plasmodium gemini
Plasmodium giganteum
Plasmodium gologoense
Plasmodium gracilis
Plasmodium guyannense
Plasmodium heischi
Plasmodium hispaniolae
Plasmodium holaspi
Plasmodium icipeensis
Plasmodium iguanae
Plasmodium josephinae
Plasmodium kentropyxi
Plasmodium koreafense
Plasmodium lacertiliae
Plasmodium lainsoni
Plasmodium lepidoptiformis
Plasmodium lionatum
Plasmodium loveridgei
Plasmodium lygosomae
Plasmodium mabuiae
Plasmodium mackerrasae
Plasmodium maculilabre
Plasmodium marginatum
Plasmodium mexicanum
Plasmodium megalotrypa
Plasmodium michikoa
Plasmodium minasense
Plasmodium minuoviride
Plasmodium pelaezi
Plasmodium pessoai
Plasmodium pifanoi
Plasmodium pitmani
Plasmodium rhadinurum
Plasmodium sasai
Plasmodium saurocaudatum
Plasmodium scorzai
Plasmodium siamense
Plasmodium robinsoni
Plasmodium sasai
Plasmodium scorzai
Plasmodium tanzaniae
Plasmodium tomodoni
Plasmodium torrealbai
Plasmodium tribolonoti
Plasmodium tropiduri
Plasmodium uluguruense
Plasmodium uzungwiense
Plasmodium vacuolatum
Plasmodium vastator
Plasmodium volans
Plasmodium wenyoni
Plasmodium zonuriae

== Host records ==
- P. agamae - the rainbow lizard (Agama agama)
- P. attenuatum - Ameiva ameiva
- P. arachniformis - chameleons
- P. aurulentum - neotropical forest gecko (Thecadactylus rapicaudus)
- P. azurophilum - anole lizards (Anolis gingivinus, Anolis gundlachi, Anolis sabanus)
- P. bailli - Anolis lizards (Anolis limifrons, Anolis lionotus and Anolis poecilopus)
- P. basilisci - the striped basilisk (Basiliscus vittatus)
- P. beebei - the gecko (Gonatodes taniae)
- P. brygooi - short-horned chameleon (Chamaeleo brevicornis)
- P. chiricahuae - fence lizard (Sceloporus jarrovi)
- P. circularis - Australian skink (Egernia stokesii)
- P. cnemaspi - African gecko (Cnemaspis africana)
- P. cnemidophori - Ameiva ameiva
- P. colombiense - Anolis lizard (Anolis auratus)
- P. diploglossi - Anguid lizard (Diploglossus fasciatus)
- P. draconis - the flying lizard (Draco volans)
- P. egerniae - the land mullet (Egernia major)
- P. fairchildi - Anolis lizard (Anolis cupreus)
- P. floridense - anole lizards (Anolis biporcatus, Anolis carolinensis, Anolis frenatus, Anolis gingivinus, Anolis gundlachi, Anolis limifrons, Anolis pentaprion, Anolis sabanus and Anolis sagrei)
- P. giganteum - the rainbow lizard (Agama agama), the African tropical lizard (Agama cyanogaster)
- P. gologoense - chameleons
- P. gracilis - skink (Tribolonotus gracilis)
- P. guyannense - the iguanid lizard (Plica plica)
- P. heischi - skinks (Mabuya striata)
- P. hispaniolae - Anolis lizards
- P. holaspi - African flying lizard (Holaspis guentheri)
- P. iguanae - Iguana iguana iguana
- P. kentropyxi - teiid lizard (Kentropyx calcarata)
- P. lacertiliae - crocodile skink (Tribolonotus species)
- P. lainsoni - the gecko (Phyllodactylus ventralis)
- P. lepidoptiformis - teiid lizard (Kentropyx calcarata)
- P. lionatum - the flying gecko (Ptychozoon lionatum)
- P. loveridgei - African gecko (Lygodactylus picturatus)
- P. lygosomae - skink (Lygosoma moco)
- P. mabuiae - African skink (Mabuya quinquetaeiata)
- P. mackerrasae - Australian skinks (Egernia cunninghami, Egernia stokesii and Egernia striolata)
- P. maculilabre - African skink (Mabuya species)
- P. marginatum - Anolis lizard (Anolis frenatus)
- P. mexicanum - fence lizards (Sceloporus occidentalis)
- P. michikoa - chameleons
- P. minasense - African skink (Mabuya agilis)
- P. minasense anolisi - Anolis lizards (Anolis cybotes, Anolis distichus, Anolis frenatus and Anolis limifrons)
- P. minasense calcaratae - teiid lizard (Kentropyx calcarata)
- P. minasense capitoi - Anolis lizard (Anolis capito)
- P. minasense carinii - iguanid lizard (Iguana iguana)
- P. minasense diminutivum - dwarf tegu lizard (Ameiva ameiva)
- P. minasense minasense - African skink (Mabuya mabouya)
- P. minasense plicae - olive tree runner lizard (Plica umbra)
- P. minasense tegui - blue tengu lizard (Tupinambis teguixin)
- P. pelaezi - the iguanid lizard (Urosaurus bicarinatus bicarinatus)
- P. pessoai - snakes (Spilotes pullatus and Lachesis muta)
- P. pifanoi - the green ameiva lizard (Ameiva ameiva) and a teiid lizard (Kentropyx calcarata)
- P. pitmani - African skink (Mabuya species)
- P. rhadinurum - Iguana iguana iguana
- P. robinsoni - the Parson's Chameleon (Chamaelo parsoni crucifer)
- P. sasai - Japanese lacertids (Takydromus tachydromoides and Takydromus smaragdinus)
- P. saurocaudatum - the many-lined sun skink (Mabuya multifasciata)
- P. scorzai - the gecko Phyllodactylus ventralis
- P. siamense - lizards.
- P. tanzaniae - chameleons
- P. tomodoni - snakes
- P. torrealbai - Anolis lizards
- P. tribolonoti - skinks (Tribolonotus gracilis)
- P. tropiduri - iguanid lizard (Tropidurus torquatus), Anolis lizards (Anolis biporcatus, Anolis cybotes, Anolis frenatus, Anolis limifrons, Anolis lionotus, Anolis pentaprion and Anolis poecilopus), teiid lizard (Kentropyx calcarata)
- P. tropiduri aquaticum - Anolis lizards (Anolis lionotus and Anolis poecilopus)
- P. tropiduri panamense - Anolis lizard (Anolis biporcatus)
- P. tropiduri tropiduri - Tropidurus hispidus
- P. robinsoni - the red-headed rock agama lizard (Agama agama)
- P. uluguruense - African gecko (Hemidactylus platycephalus)
- P. uzungwiense - chameleons
- P. vacuolatum - the rainforest lizard (Plica umbra)
- P. vastator - the flying lizard (Draco volans)
- P. volans - the flying lizard (Draco volans)
- P. wenyoni - snakes

== Subspecies ==
- P. fairchildi - P. fairchildi fairchildi and P. fairchildi hispaniolae
- P. lygosomae - P. lygosomae nucleoversans and P. lygosomae nucleoversans
- P. minasense - P. minasense anolisi, P. minasense capitoi, P. minasense carinii,
- P. minasense diminutivum, P. minasense minasense, P. minasense plicae, and P. minasense tegui. An additional subspecies P. minasense calcaratae has also been described.
- P. traguli - P. traguli traguli and P. traguli memmina.
- P. tropiduri - P. tropiduri aquaticum, P. tropiduri panamense and P. tropiduri tropiduri.

== Vectors ==
Compared with those known for the species infecting humans, few vectors are known for these species.

- P. agamae - Lutzomyia or Culicoides species

Culex:

- Culex fatigans - P. rhadinurum

Aedes:

- Aedes aegypti - P. rhadinurum

== Interrelatedness ==
- P. floridense is closely related to P. tropiduri and P. minasense
