= Plasmodium minasense =

Scientific classification
- Domain: Eukaryota
- Clade: Sar
- Clade: Alveolata
- Phylum: Apicomplexa
- Class: Aconoidasida
- Order: Haemospororida
- Family: Plasmodiidae
- Genus: Plasmodium
- Species: P. minasense

Binomial name
- Plasmodium minasense Carini and Rudolphi, 1912

Species of single-celled organism

Plasmodium minasense is a parasite of the genus Plasmodium subgenus Carinamoeba.

Like all Plasmodium species P. minasense has both vertebrate and insect hosts. The vertebrate hosts for this parasite are lizards.

== Taxonomy ==
The original description of this species was by Carini and Rudolphi in 1912 in a lizard Mabuia agilis. Since then a number of subspecies of P. minasense have been described.

The diagnostic features of P. minasense are:

- The schizonts are smaller than normal erythrocyte nuclei.
- Schzonts produce 4-8 merozoites
- The gametocytes are equal to or smaller than erythrocyte nuclei in size and round in shape
- They infect hosts of the lizard families Scincidae, Iguanidae and Teiidae in the Neotropics

It is currently thought that P. minasense is closely related to Plasmodium floridense and Plasmodium tropiduri. Like much of the taxonomy in this genus this opinion may need to be revised once the species have been subjected to DNA analysis.

=== Subspecies ===
Subspecies are currently named on the basis of the hosts infected. This criterion may be subject to revision when DNA based taxonomy is applied to this species complex. The subspecies currently recognised include:

P. minasense anolisi
P. minasense calcaratae
P. minasense capitoi
P. minasense carinii
P. minasense diminutivum
P. minasense minasense
P. minasense plicae
P. minasense tegui

=== P. minasense anolisi ===
Described by Telford in 1979

==== Distribution ====
Found in Panama, Central America and the Caribbean.

==== Hosts ====
Known hosts include the lizards Anolis cybotes, Anolis distichus, Anolis frenatus and Anolis limifrons

=== P. minasense calcaratae ===
This subspecies was described by Telford and Telford in 2003.

It is characterized by very small, usually fan-shaped, schizonts that average 3.4 × 2.6 micrometres (range: 2.5 – 4.5 × 2.0 – 3.0). The schizonts produce 3.9 (range: 3 – 4) merozoites.

The gametocytes are spherical or ovoid averaging 6.7 × 5.0 micrometres (range: 4.5 – 9.0 × 3.0 – 7.0) in size with a length-width product of 33.7 (range: 15 – 54) and a length/width ratio of 1.4 (range: 1.0 – 2.3). By dimension they are not sexual dimorphic.

==== Distribution ====
Found in Venezuela, South America.

==== Hosts ====
The only known host is the lizard Kentropyx calcarata

=== P. minasense capitoi ===
This subspecies was described by Telford in 1979.

==== Distribution ====
Found in Panama, Central America.

==== Hosts ====
The only known host is the lizard Anolis capito

=== P. minasense carinii ===
This subspecies was described by Leger and Mouzels in 1917

==== Distribution ====
Found in coastal South America.

==== Hosts ====
The only known host is the lizard Iguana iguana

=== P. minasense diminutivum ===
This subspecies was described by Telford in 1973

==== Distribution ====
Found in Panama, Central America.

==== Hosts ====
The only known host is the lizard Ameiva ameiva

=== P. minasense minasense ===
This is recognised as the type species. It was described by Carini and Rudolphi in 1912 in a lizard Mabuya agilis.

==== Distribution ====
Found in Brazil, Central America.

==== Hosts ====
Known hosts include the lizards Mabuya agilis and Mabuya mabouya.

=== P. minasense plicae ===
This subspecies was described by Telford in 1979.

==== Distribution ====
Found in Guyana, South America.

==== Hosts ====
The only known host is the lizard Plica umbra

=== P. minasense tegui ===
==== Distribution ====
Found in Venezuela, South America.

==== Hosts ====
The only known host is the lizard Tupinambis teguixin
