= Plasmodium balli =

Scientific classification
- Domain: Eukaryota
- Clade: Sar
- Clade: Alveolata
- Phylum: Apicomplexa
- Class: Aconoidasida
- Order: Haemospororida
- Family: Plasmodiidae
- Genus: Plasmodium
- Species: P. balli

Binomial name
- Plasmodium balli Telford, 1969

Species of single-celled organism

Plasmodium balli is a parasite of the genus Plasmodium.

Like all Plasmodium species it has vertebrate and insect hosts. The vertebrate hosts are lizards; the insect vector is not yet known.

== Description ==
Telford first described Plasmodium balli in 1969.

The host's proerythrocytes and normoblasts are more commonly parasitized than erythrocytes.

Pigment is uncommon but when present, it consists of a minute dot.

Enucleated host cells are common.

The gametocytes are large and elongated. Hypertrophy, distortion and lysis of host cell nuclei may result from parasitization of immature blood cells by this stage.

The schizonts produced up to 100 merozoites.

== Geographic occurrence ==
This parasite is found in the Caribbean and Central America.

== Clinical features and host pathology ==
Host record:

Anole lizards - Anolis limifrons, Anolis lionotus and Anolis poecilopus
