= Plasmodium tropiduri =

Scientific classification
- Domain: Eukaryota
- Clade: Sar
- Clade: Alveolata
- Phylum: Apicomplexa
- Class: Aconoidasida
- Order: Haemospororida
- Family: Plasmodiidae
- Genus: Plasmodium
- Species: P. tropiduri

Binomial name
- Plasmodium tropiduri Aragão and Neiva, 1909

Species of single-celled organism

Plasmodium tropiduri is a parasite of the genus Plasmodium subgenus Lacertamoeba. As in all Plasmodium species, P. tropiduri has both vertebrate and insect hosts. The vertebrate hosts for this parasite are reptiles.

This species is closely related to Plasmodium floridense and Plasmodium minasense.

== Taxonomy ==
The parasite was first described by Aragão and Neiva in 1909. It had been previous discovered by Carlos Chagas but not formally described. Later it was realised that this species was in fact a species complex. This complex was divided into a number of subspecies by Telford in 1979.

=== Subspecies ===
- Plasmodium tropiduri aquaticum is found in Anolis lionotus and Anolis poecilopus in Panama and Costa Rica. Schizonts are found mostly in pro-erythrocytes, are smaller than erythrocyte nuclei, have 4 to 14 nuclei and contain pigment. Gametocytes occur in erythrocytes, are smaller than erythrocyte nuclei and contain pigment.
- Plasmodium tropiduri caribbense Telford, Johnson and Young, 1989
- Plasmodium tropiduri panamense is found in Anolis biporcatus in Panama. Schizonts occur mostly in pro-erythrocytes, are seldom pigmented and are larger in pro-erythrocytes than in erythrocytes They are smaller than erythrocyte nuclei and contain 4 to 18 nuclei. Gametocytes are slightly smaller than erythrocyte nuclei, and are more common in erythrocytes.
- Plasmodium tropiduri tropiduri is found in Tropidurus lizards including Tropidurus torquatus in Brazil, the Guianas and Venezuela. Schizonts are larger than the erythrocyte nuclei and contain 8 to 22 nuclei in a rosette. Pigment is always present. Gametocytes are round or oval and are larger than the erythrocyte nuclei.

== Description ==
This species may be able to develop in thrombocytes as well as erythrocytes.

== Distribution ==
This species complex is found in Brazil, Costa Rica, the Guianas, Panama and Venezuela.

== Vectors ==
Not known.

== Hosts ==
This species has been found in Anolis biporcatus, Anolis cybotes, Anolis lionotus, Anolis poecilopus and Tropidurus torquatus.
