= Neotropical green anole =

There are two species of lizard named neotropical green anole:

- Anolis biporcatus, found in Mexico, Central America, Colombia, and Venezuela
- Anolis parvauritus, found in Colombia and Ecuador
