= Lacertamoeba =

Scientific classification
- Domain: Eukaryota
- Clade: Diaphoretickes
- Clade: SAR
- Clade: Alveolata
- Phylum: Apicomplexa
- Class: Aconoidasida
- Order: Haemospororida
- Family: Plasmodiidae
- Genus: Plasmodium
- Subgenus: Lacertamoeba; Telford, 1979

Species
- See text

Subgenus of single-celled organisms

Lacertamoeba is a subgenus of the genus Plasmodium — all of which are parasites. All species in this subgenus infect reptiles.

== Taxonomy ==
This subgenus was created by Telford to refine the classification of species then given as Plasmodium tropiduri.

=== Species ===
- Plasmodium arachniformis
- Plasmodium brygooi
- Plasmodium cnemaspi
- Plasmodium fischeri
- Plasmodium floridense
- Plasmodium gologoense
- Plasmodium holaspi
- Plasmodium intabazwe
- Plasmodium lepidoptiformis
- Plasmodium loveridgei
- Plasmodium pitmani
- Plasmodium tanzaniae
- Plasmodium torrealbai
- Plasmodium tropiduri
- Plasmodium uluguruense
- Plasmodium uzungwiense
- Plasmodium vautieri
- Plasmodium zonuriae

== Diagnostic features ==
Species in the subgenus Lacertamoeba have the following characteristics:The gametocytes are medium-sized The schizonts undergo 3 to 5 nuclear divisions and are also medium-sized.
