= Plasmodium vacuolatum =

Scientific classification
- Domain: Eukaryota
- Clade: Sar
- Clade: Alveolata
- Phylum: Apicomplexa
- Class: Aconoidasida
- Order: Haemospororida
- Family: Plasmodiidae
- Genus: Plasmodium
- Species: P. vacuolatum

Binomial name
- Plasmodium vacuolatum Telford, 1979

Species of single-celled organism

Plasmodium vacuolatum is a parasite of the genus Plasmodium.

Like all Plasmodium species P. vacuolatum has both vertebrate and insect hosts. The vertebrate hosts for this parasite are reptiles.

== Description ==
The parasite was first described by Telford in 1979. This species was previously regarded as Plasmodium tropiduri.

== Geographical occurrence ==
This species is found in Brazil, South America.

== Clinical features and host pathology ==
This species infects the tree runner lizard (Plica umbra).
