= Anolis higuey =

Scientific classification
- Kingdom: Animalia
- Phylum: Chordata
- Class: Reptilia
- Order: Squamata
- Suborder: Iguania
- Family: Dactyloidae
- Genus: Anolis
- Species: A. higuey

Binomial name
- Anolis higuey (Köhler, Zimmer, McGrath, & Hedges, 2019)

Synonyms
- Audantia higuey Köhler et al., 2019

Species of lizard

Anolis higuey, the Cordillera Oriental stout anole, is a species of lizard in the family Dactyloidae. Males grow to 69 mm (2.7 in) and females to 51 mm (2.0 in) in snout–vent length. Males have dirty-white dewlaps with a yellow, green, or orange hue and regularly-arranged gorgetals, smaller in size towards the center of the dewlap. It is endemic to the eastern Dominican Republic, where it lives in a variety of habitats at elevations of up to 290 m (950 ft).

== Taxonomy ==
Anolis higuey was formally described in 2019 as Audantia higuey based on a specimen from Manatí Park Bávaro in the La Altagracia Province of the Dominican Republic. The species is named after Higüey, a pre-Columbian Taíno chiefdom that was located in the anole's range. It has the common name Cordillera Oriental stout anole.

Specimens of Anolis higuey were historically considered to represent Anolis cybotes, but A. higuey is in actuality most closely related to a clade formed by A. doris, armouri, shrevei, ravifaux, and hispaniolae. The extremely large genus Anolis is sometimes split into several smaller genera; under this arrangement, Anolis higuey is placed in the genus Audantia, a group of more than a dozen species endemic to Hispaniola.

== Description ==
Males of the species grow to a snout–vent length of 69 mm (2.7 in) and females to 51 mm (2.0 in). Males have dirty-white dewlaps with a yellow, green, or orange hue and regularly-arranged gorgetals, smaller in size towards the center of the dewlap. There are no dark stripes on the throat.

== Distribution and ecology ==
Anolis higuey is endemic to the Dominican Republic, a Caribbean country that occupies the eastern portion of the island of Hispaniola, which it shares with Haiti. A. higuey is found across the east of the country. The anole lives in a variety of habitats, including those affected by anthropogenic disturbance, at elevations of up to 290 m (950 ft). These anoles can be seen perched upside-down on low vegetation in the daytime, as well as sleeping on vegetation at night.

Anolis higuey has not been evaluated by the IUCN, but the authors who described the species recommended it be classified as being of least concern due to its sufficiently large range and tolerance of disturbed habitat.
