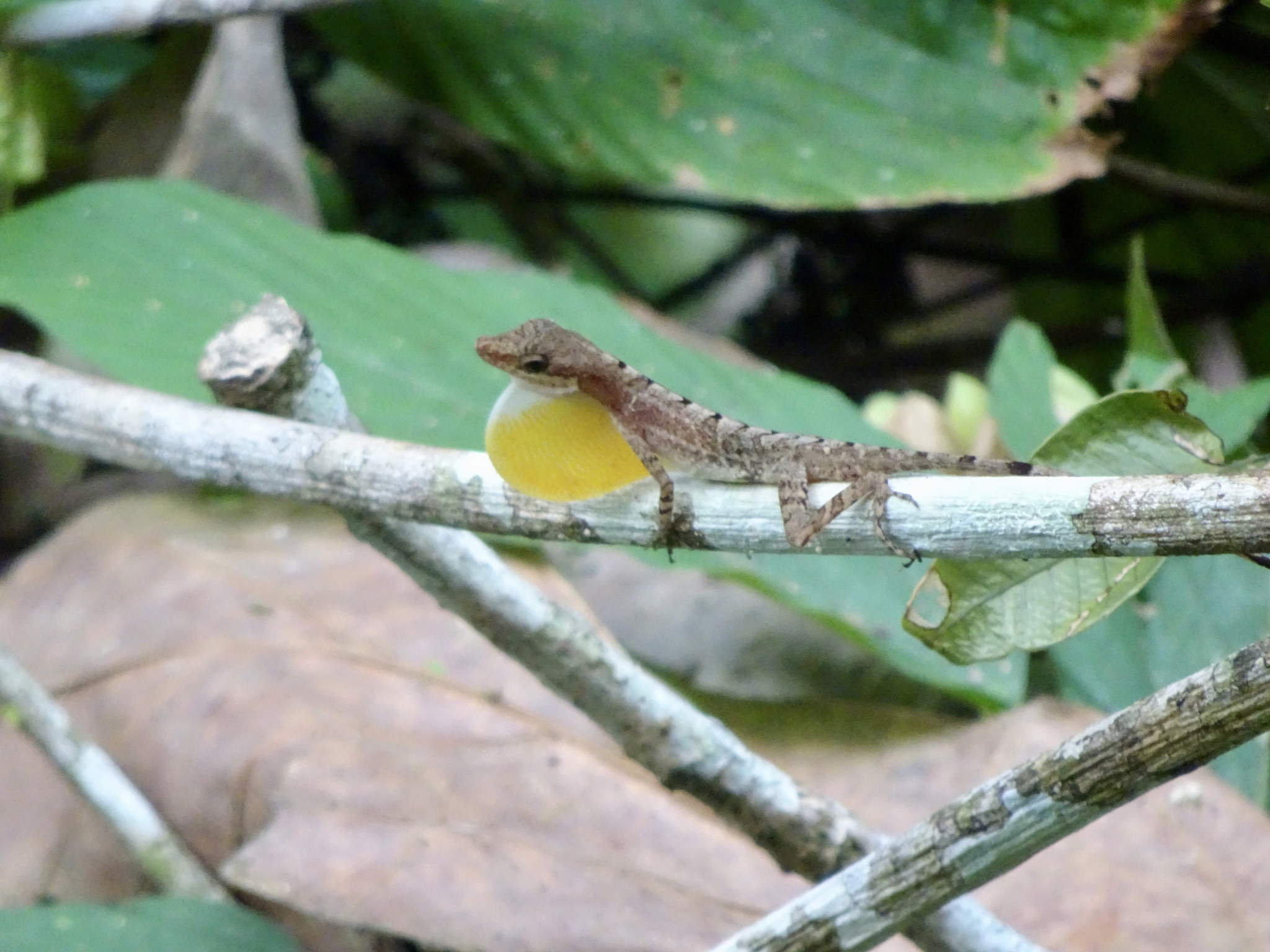

Conservation status
- Least Concern (IUCN 3.1)

Scientific classification
- Kingdom: Animalia
- Phylum: Chordata
- Class: Reptilia
- Order: Squamata
- Suborder: Iguania
- Family: Dactyloidae
- Genus: Anolis
- Species: A. apletophallus

Binomial name
- Anolis apletophallus Köhler and Sunyer, 2008

= Anolis apletophallus =

Species of lizard

Anolis apletophallus is a species of anoles, iguanian lizards in the family Dactyloidae native to Panama. The species was split from Anolis limifrons in Köhler and Sunyer (2008). It has been reported in Panama, Honduras and Colombia. A decline in its population in Panama over a 40-year timespan has been attributed to changes in local climate, with years following El Niño negatively affecting the species.

== History and taxonomy ==
Only fairly recently recognized as its own species, the specific epithet of this species translates to "immense penis", due to its large bi-lobed hemipenis as an identifying feature described by Köhler and Sunyer (2008).

== Description ==
A. apletophallus is a relatively small mainland anole getting to about 40–45 mm (snout-to-vent), but have a large dewlap relative to their body size. The species displays dewlap polymorphism, where some populations' dewlaps are orange, while others are white with a basal orange dot, and others still display both dewlap morphs. No genetic differences were found between individuals with different dewlap morphs. They are rather short-lived with a 9 month generation time making them an annual species, with the adults reaching maturity in about 4–6 months.

== Distribution and habitat ==
A. apletophallus is a mainland species native to Panama and may also be found in Colombia.
