= Rosette (schizont appearance) =

General symptoms and signs in medicine

The rosette is a formation characteristic of schizonts in infection by the reptile parasites Plasmodium tropiduri and P. holaspi or by the fish parasite Babesiosoma.

It is also seen in the case of human parasite Plasmodium malariae.
