= Plasmodium marginatum =

Scientific classification
- Domain: Eukaryota
- Clade: Sar
- Clade: Alveolata
- Phylum: Apicomplexa
- Class: Aconoidasida
- Order: Haemospororida
- Family: Plasmodiidae
- Genus: Plasmodium
- Species: P. marginatum

Binomial name
- Plasmodium marginatum Telford, 1979

Species of single-celled organism

Plasmodium marginatum is a parasite of the genus Plasmodium subgenus Sauramoeba. As in all Plasmodium species, P. marginatum has both vertebrate and insect hosts. The vertebrate hosts for this parasite are reptiles.

== Taxonomy ==
The parasite was first described by Telford in 1979. This species had previously been considered to be Plasmodium tropiduri.

== Description ==
All stages tend to lie along the erythrocyte margin.

While mature schizonts appear to be like flattened fans with 3 to 8 merozoites, immature schizonts are highly amoeboid.

Gametocytes are smaller than erythrocyte nuclei.

== Distribution ==
This species is found in Central America and South America.

== Hosts ==
The only known host is the anole lizard Anolis frenatus.
