= Copper anole =

There are two species of lizard named copper anole:

- Anolis cupreus, found in Honduras, Nicaragua, and Costa Rica
- Anolis cuprinus, found in Mexico
