= List of amphibians and reptiles of Saba =

This is a list of amphibians and reptiles found on the island of Saba, a Dutch municipality in the Caribbean Lesser Antilles.

== Amphibians ==
There is one species of amphibian on Saba.

=== Frogs (Anura) ===
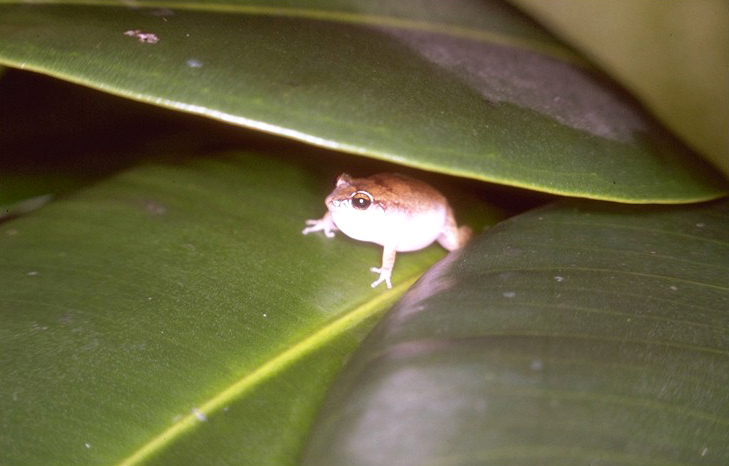
Tropical frogs (Leptodactylidae)
Species	Common name(s)	Notes	Image
Eleutherodactylus johnstonei	Lesser Antillean Whistling Frog, Coqui Antillano, Johnstone's Whistling Frog	Least Concern.

== Reptiles ==
Including marine turtles and introduced species, there are 11 reptile species reported on Saba. One species, the Saban Anole (Anolis sabanus), is endemic to Saba.

=== Turtles (Testudines) ===
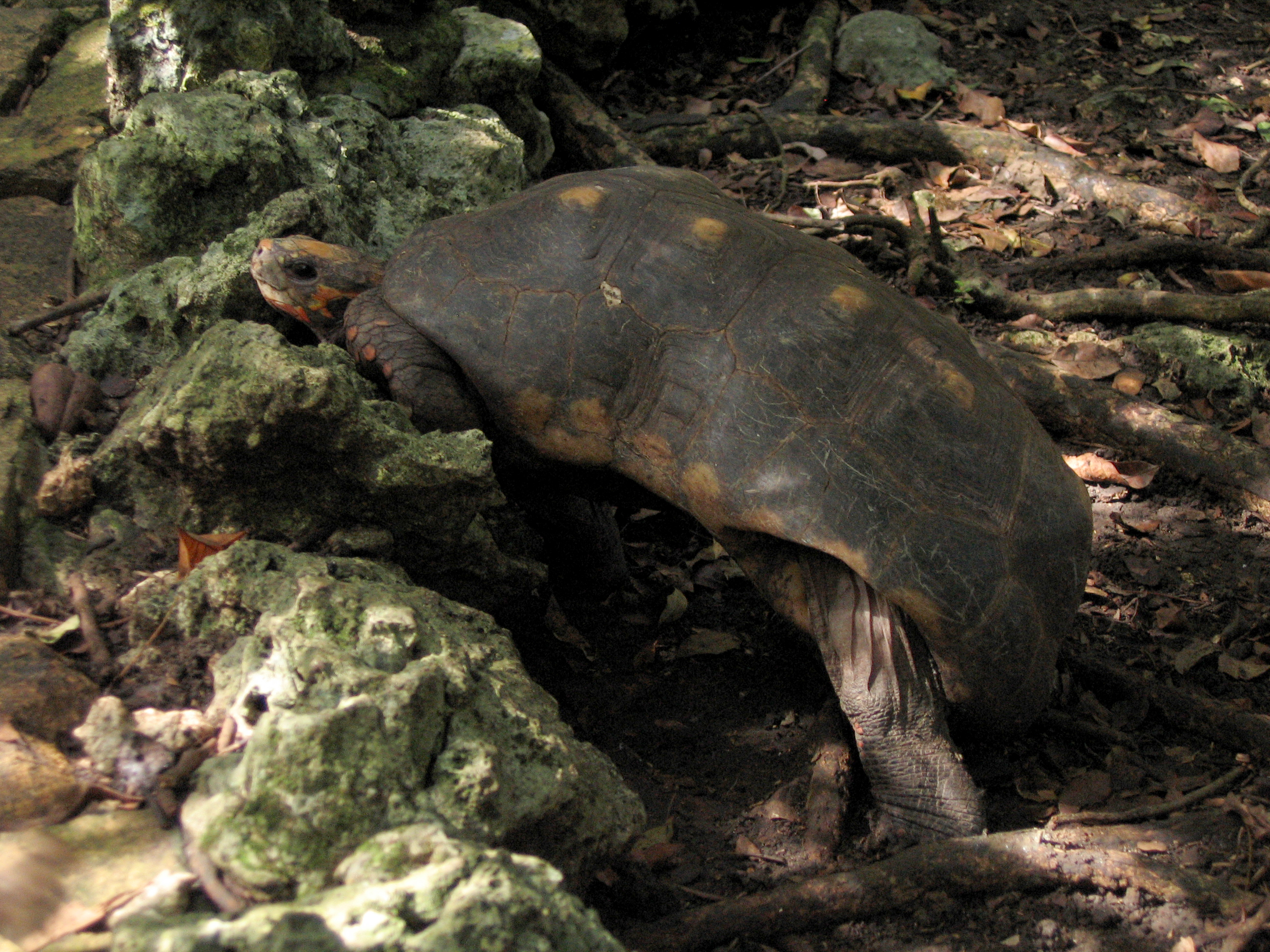
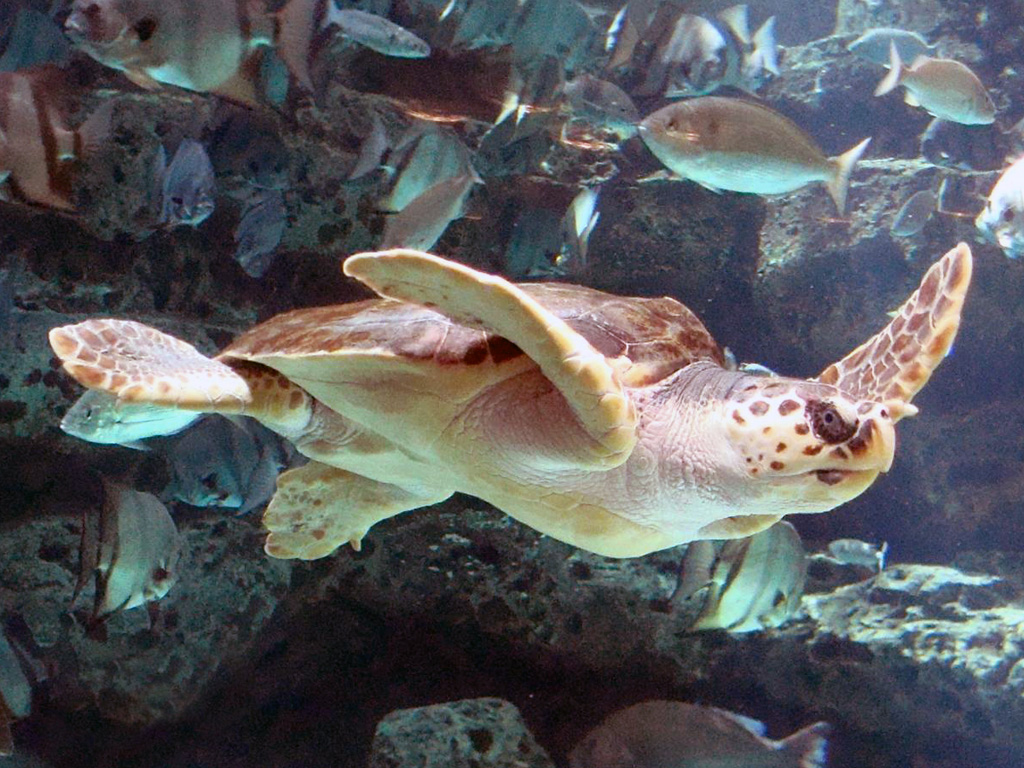
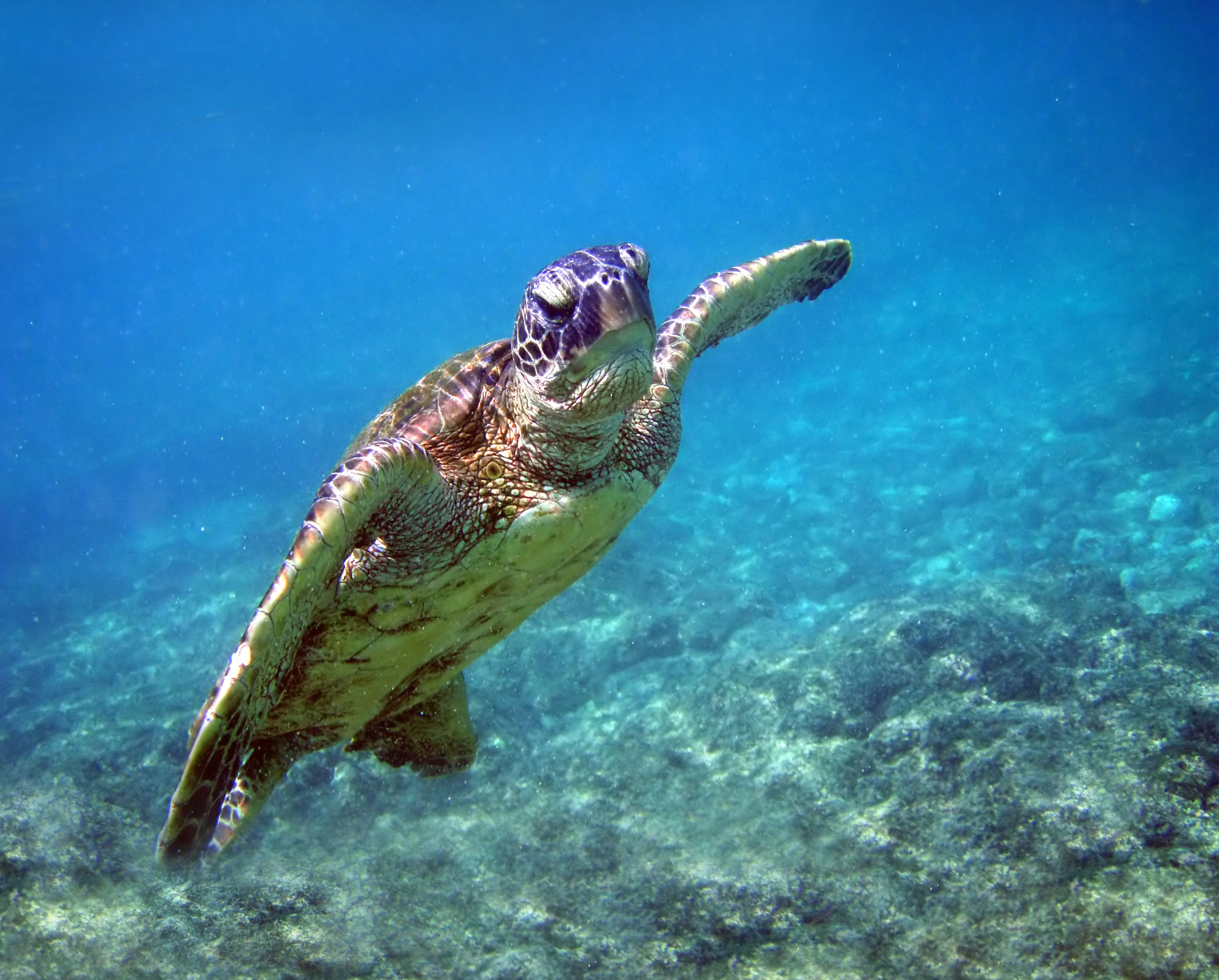
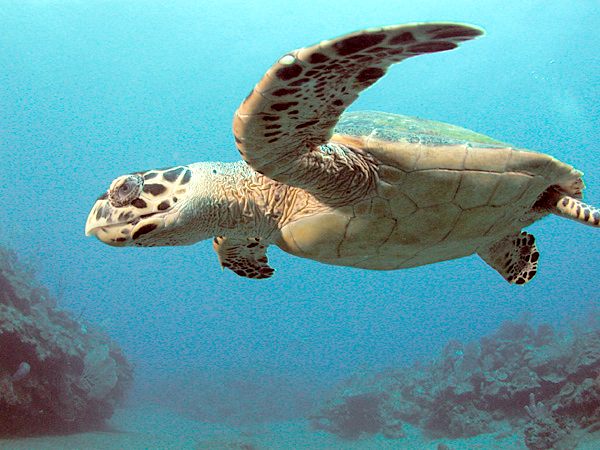
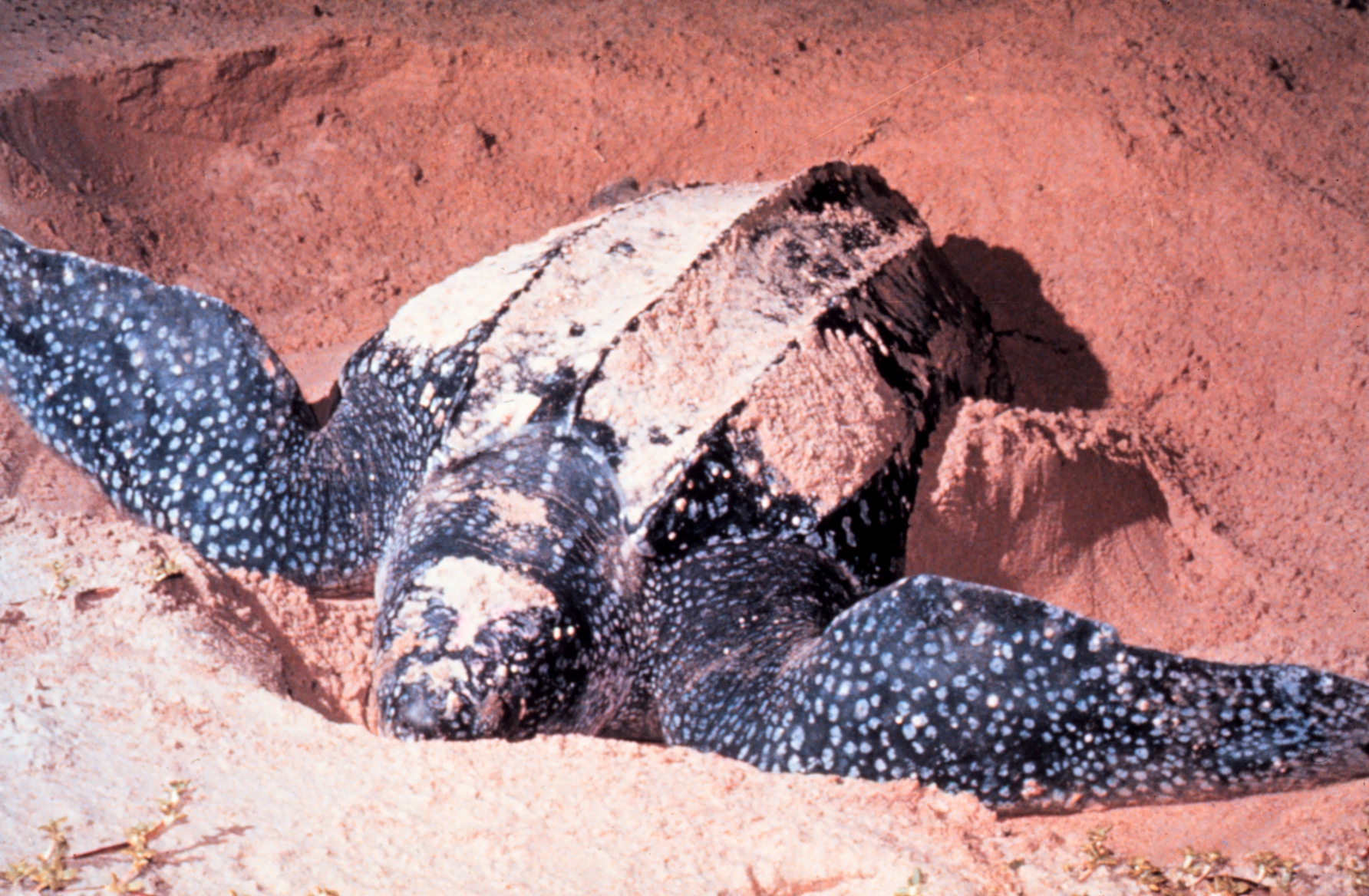
Tortoises (Testudinidae)
Species	Common name(s)	Notes	Image
Geochelone carbonaria	Red-Footed Tortoise
Scaly sea turtles (Cheloniidae)
Species	Common name(s)	Notes	Image
Caretta caretta	Loggerhead Turtle	Endangered.
Chelonia mydas	Green Turtle	Endangered.
Eretmochelys imbricata	Hawksbill Turtle	Critically Endangered.
Leathery sea turtles (Dermochelyidae)
Species	Common name(s)	Notes	Image
Dermochelys coriacea	Leatherback Turtle	Critically Endangered.

=== Lizards and snakes (Squamata) ===
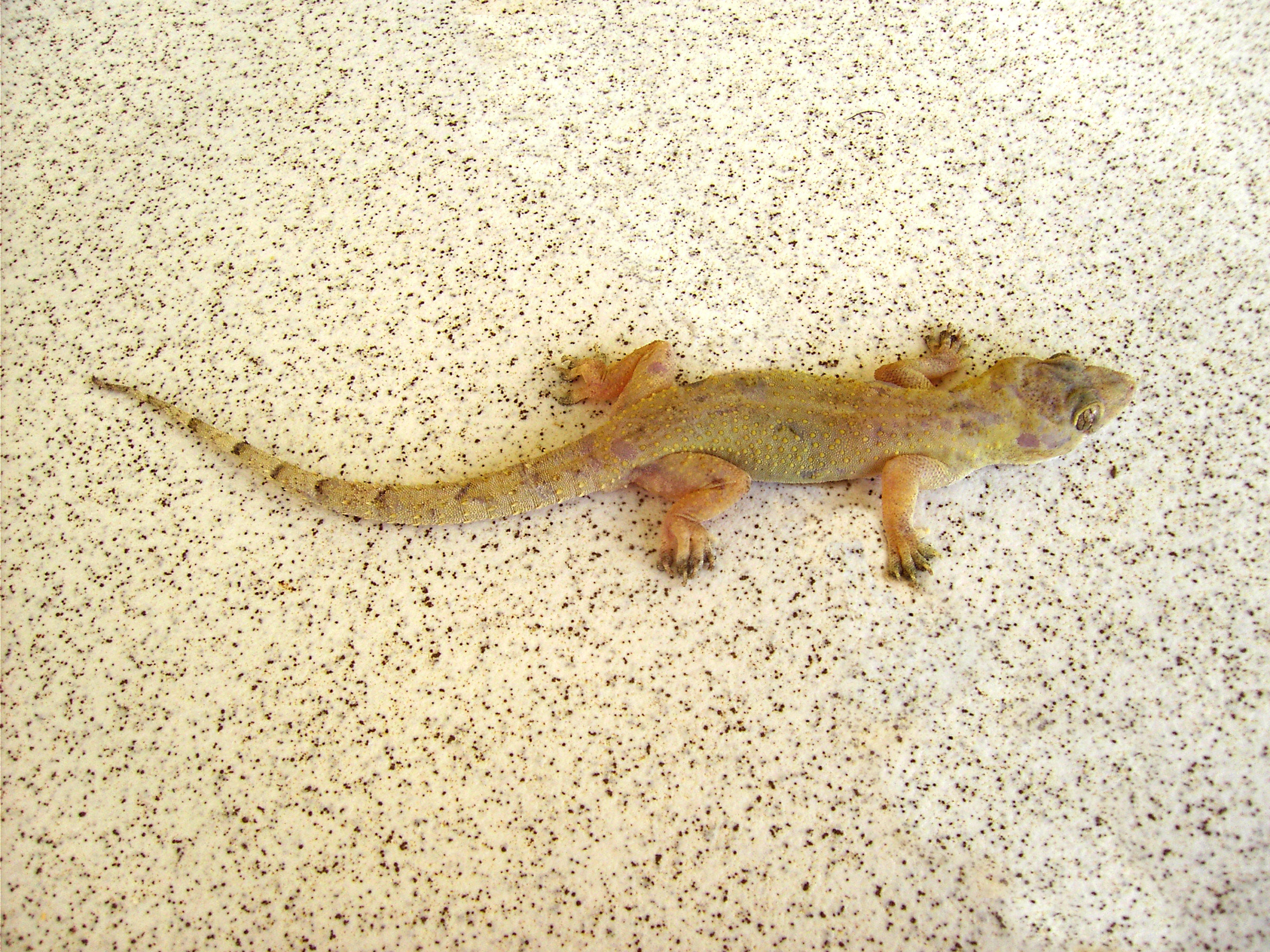
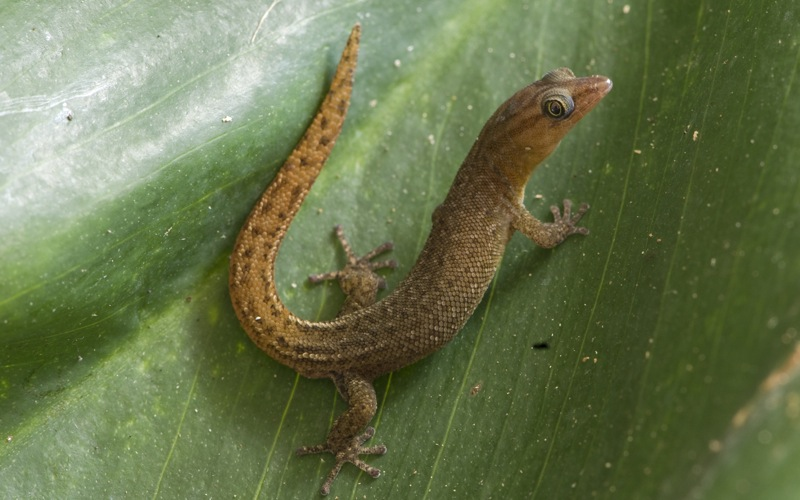
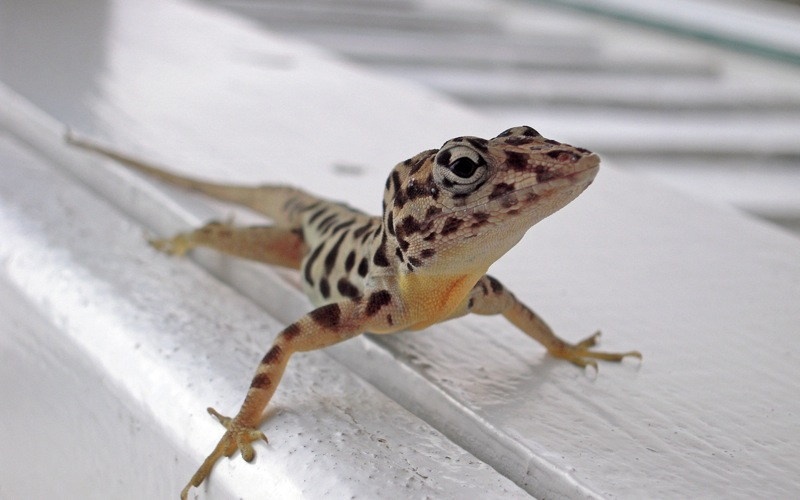
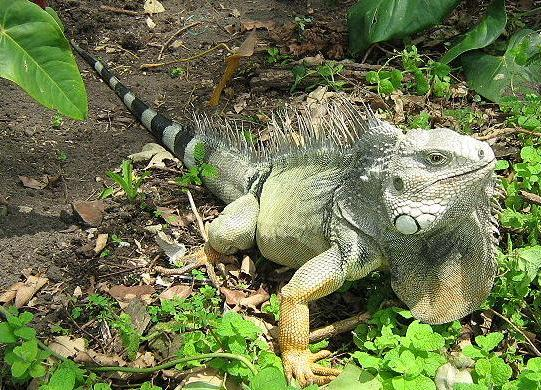
Geckos (Gekkonidae)
Species	Common name(s)	Notes	Image
Hemidactylus mabouia	House Gecko	Introduced.
Sphaerodactylus sabanus	Saba Least Gecko	Regionally endemic. Abundant.
Thecadactylus rapicauda	Turnip-Tailed Gecko	Rare.
Iguanas and Anolids (Iguanidae)
Species	Common name(s)	Notes	Image
Anolis sabanus	Saban Anole	Endemic. Widespread and common.
Iguana iguana	Green Iguana, Common Iguana	Rare. Population on Saba is possibly a distinct species.
Colubrids (Colubridae)
Species	Common name(s)	Notes	Image
Alsophis rufiventris	Saba Racer, Red-bellied Racer, Orange-bellied Racer	Endangered. Regional endemic. Widespread and abundant on Saba.
