= Plasmodium gracilis =

Scientific classification
- Domain: Eukaryota
- Clade: Sar
- Clade: Alveolata
- Phylum: Apicomplexa
- Class: Aconoidasida
- Order: Haemospororida
- Family: Plasmodiidae
- Genus: Plasmodium
- Species: P. gracilis

Binomial name
- Plasmodium gracilis Telford and Wellehan, 2005

Species of single-celled organism

Plasmodium gracilis is a parasite of the genus Plasmodium.

Like all Plasmodium species P. gracilis has both vertebrate and insect hosts. The vertebrate hosts for this parasite are reptiles.

== Description ==
The parasite was first described by Telford and Wellehan in 2005.

== Geographical occurrence ==
This species is found in New Guinea.

== Clinical features and host pathology ==
This species infects the crocodile skink Tribolonotus gracilis.
