= Plasmodium kentropyxi =

Scientific classification
- Domain: Eukaryota
- Clade: Sar
- Clade: Alveolata
- Phylum: Apicomplexa
- Class: Aconoidasida
- Order: Haemospororida
- Family: Plasmodiidae
- Genus: Plasmodium
- Species: P. kentropyxi

Binomial name
- Plasmodium kentropyxi Lainson et al., 2001

Species of single-celled organism

Plasmodium kentropyxi is a parasite of the genus Plasmodium subgenus Sauramoeba.

== Taxonomy ==
The parasite was first described by Lainson et al. in 2001.

== Description ==
Young asexual stages are initially polar in the erythrocyte but with maturation, move to a lateral position. The larger meronts may slightly enlarge the erythrocyte but most asexual stages do not. Conspicuous greenish-black pigment granules are located in a distinct vacuole.

The largest schizonts contain 30-40 nuclei.

The gametocytes are at first polar in the erythrocyte but gradually move to a lateral position. They eventually assume a smooth, curved cylindrical shape with evenly rounded ends. Pigment is scattered or concentrated around a conspicuous vacuole which is slowly developed as the gametocytes mature. The mature gametocytes occasionally enlarge the erythrocyte.

Mature male parasites measured 11.8 x 4.0 micrometres (range: 9.6 x 4.2 - 13.2 x 3.6 micrometres) and females 13.5 x 4.5 micrometres (range: 12.0 x 4.5 - 15.0 x 4.8 micrometres).

== Hosts ==
Like all Plasmodium species P. kentropyxi has both vertebrate and insect hosts. The vertebrate hosts for this parasite are reptiles. The only known vertebrate host is the teiid lizard Kentropyx calcarata.

== Distribution ==
This species is found in Brazil and Surinam.
