= Plasmodium lainsoni =

Scientific classification
- Domain: Eukaryota
- Clade: Sar
- Clade: Alveolata
- Phylum: Apicomplexa
- Class: Aconoidasida
- Order: Haemospororida
- Family: Plasmodiidae
- Genus: Plasmodium
- Species: P. lainsoni

Binomial name
- Plasmodium lainsoni Telford, 1978

Species of single-celled organism

Plasmodium lainsoni is a parasite of the genus Plasmodium.

Like all Plasmodium species P. lainsoni has both vertebrate and insect hosts. The vertebrate hosts for this parasite are reptiles.

== Description ==
The parasite was first described by Telford in 1978. It produces rounded schizonts containing 14 to 32 merozoites. Its gametocytes are typically round or oval.

== Geographical occurrence ==
This species is found in Venezuela, South America.

== Clinical features and host pathology ==
The only known host of this species is the lizard Phyllodactylus ventralis.
