= Plasmodium tribolonoti =

Scientific classification
- Domain: Eukaryota
- Clade: Diaphoretickes
- Clade: SAR
- Clade: Alveolata
- Phylum: Apicomplexa
- Class: Aconoidasida
- Order: Haemospororida
- Family: Plasmodiidae
- Genus: Plasmodium
- Species: P. tribolonoti

Binomial name
- Plasmodium tribolonoti Telford and Wellehan, 2005

Species of single-celled organism

Plasmodium tribolonoti is a parasite of the genus Plasmodium.

Like all Plasmodium species P. tribolonoti has both vertebrate and insect hosts. The vertebrate hosts for this parasite are reptiles.

== Description ==
The parasite was first described by Telford and Wellehan in 2005.

== Geographical occurrence ==
This species is found in New Guinea.

== Clinical features and host pathology ==
This species infects the crocodile skink Tribolonotus gracilis.
