= Plasmodium uluguruense =

Scientific classification
- Domain: Eukaryota
- Clade: Sar
- Clade: Alveolata
- Phylum: Apicomplexa
- Class: Aconoidasida
- Order: Haemospororida
- Family: Plasmodiidae
- Genus: Plasmodium
- Species: P. uluguruense

Binomial name
- Plasmodium uluguruense Telford, 1984

Species of single-celled organism

Plasmodium uluguruense is a parasite of the genus Plasmodium subgenus Lacertamoeba.

Like all Plasmodium species P. uluguruense has both vertebrate and insect hosts. The vertebrate hosts for this parasite are reptiles.

== Description ==
The parasite was first described by Telford in 1984.

Young schizonts are elongate with blunt ends and become oval or round following the second nuclear division. Mature schizonts are smaller than the host cell nuclei, produce 4-12 merozoites and are usually arranged as a fan.

Immature gametocytes like young schizonts are elongate with blunt ends. Mature gametocytes are usually oval and approximate the host cell nuclei in size. Their pigment granules concentrated in a single focus.

== Geographical occurrence ==
This species is found in the Uluguru Mountains, Tanzania.

== Clinical features and host pathology ==
This species infects the lizard Hemidactylus platycephalus.
