= Plasmodium pifanoi =

Scientific classification
- Domain: Eukaryota
- Clade: Sar
- Clade: Alveolata
- Phylum: Apicomplexa
- Class: Aconoidasida
- Order: Haemospororida
- Family: Plasmodiidae
- Genus: Plasmodium
- Species: P. pifanoi

Binomial name
- Plasmodium pifanoi Scorza and Dagert, 1956

Species of single-celled organism

Plasmodium pifanoi is a parasite of the genus Plasmodium subgenus Paraplasmodium. As in all Plasmodium species, P. pifanoi has both vertebrate and insect hosts. The vertebrate hosts for this parasite are lizards.

== Taxonomy ==
This species was first described by Scorza and Dagert in 1956. It was redescribed in 2003 by Telford.

== Description ==
The asexual stages are irregular in shape and do not have a vacuole.

Schizonts measure 6.2 × 4.5 micrometres (range: 4 – 8 × 3 – 6) and produce on average 11.9 (range: 7 – 16) merozoites.

Gametocytes average 12.4 × 6.0 micrometres (range: 8 – 16 × 4 – 10). The average length × width product is 72.9 (range: 52 – 112) and the average length / width ratio is 2.18 (range: 1.1 – 3.3). The gametocytes always contain 1 – 5 prominent vacuoles.

Macrogametocytes during active infection are longer than microgametocytes with a greater length-width product. Gametocytes in chronic infection are slightly smaller and are not sexually dimorphic in their dimensions.

== Distribution ==
P. pifanoi is found in Venezuela, South America.

== Hosts ==
Known hosts are the lizards Ameiva ameiva and Kentropyx calcarata.
