= Plasmodium brumpti =

Scientific classification
- Domain: Eukaryota
- Clade: Sar
- Clade: Alveolata
- Phylum: Apicomplexa
- Class: Aconoidasida
- Order: Haemospororida
- Family: Plasmodiidae
- Genus: Plasmodium
- Species: P. brumpti

Binomial name
- Plasmodium brumpti Peláez and Perez-Reyes, 1952

Species of single-celled organism

Plasmodium brumpti is a parasite of the genus Plasmodium subgenus Sauramoeba. As in all Plasmodium species, P. brumpti has both vertebrate and insect hosts. The vertebrate hosts for this parasite are reptiles.

== Taxonomy ==
This species was described by Peláez and Perez-Reyes in 1952 in the reptile Sceloporus borridus. It was named after Alexandre Joseph Emile Brumpt (1877–1951) a French professor of parasitology.

== Description ==
Plasmodium brumpti are differentiated from other Plasmodium species by several characteristics. In the blood of the reptile host, parasites in the schizont stage produce 12-22 merozoites. The gametocytes are elongated and ovular. Both schizonts and gametocytes are fairly large, more than twice the size of the host cell nucleus.

== Distribution ==
P. brumpti has been found in reptiles in Morelos, Alpoyeca, and Puente de Ixtla, Mexico.

== See also ==
- List of Plasmodium species infecting reptiles
