= Plasmodium sasai =

Scientific classification
- Domain: Eukaryota
- Clade: Sar
- Clade: Alveolata
- Phylum: Apicomplexa
- Class: Aconoidasida
- Order: Haemospororida
- Family: Plasmodiidae
- Genus: Plasmodium
- Species: P. sasai

Binomial name
- Plasmodium sasai Telford and Ball, 1969

Species of single-celled organism

Plasmodium sasai is a parasite of the genus Plasmodium subgenus Sauramoeba.

Like all Plasmodium species P. sasai has both vertebrate and insect hosts. The vertebrate hosts for this parasite are reptiles.

== Description ==
The parasite was first described by Telford and Ball in 1969 in the lacertid Takydromus tachydromoides.

== Geographical occurrence ==
This species is found in Japan and Thailand.

== Clinical features and host pathology ==
The vertebrate hosts for this species are lizards of the genus Takydromus. The insect vector is not yet known.

Infection of Takydromus tachydromoides is commonw with 90% adults infected. Infection occurs early in life with 80%+ infected within the first few weeks of hatching.
