= Plasmodium torrealbai =

Scientific classification
- Domain: Eukaryota
- Clade: Sar
- Clade: Alveolata
- Phylum: Apicomplexa
- Class: Aconoidasida
- Order: Haemospororida
- Family: Plasmodiidae
- Genus: Plasmodium
- Species: P. torrealbai

Binomial name
- Plasmodium torrealbai Scorza and Dagbert, 1957

Species of single-celled organism

Plasmodium torrealbai is a parasite of the genus Plasmodium subgenus Lacertamoeba. As in all Plasmodium species P. torrealbai has both vertebrate and insect hosts. The vertebrate hosts for this parasite are reptiles.

== Taxonomy ==
The parasite was first described by Scorza and Dagbert in 1957.

== Description ==
The trophozoites are irregularly shaped with filiform extensions.

The schizonts contain 8 to 20 nuclei arranged in a fan.

Pigment is present at the base of the fan.

The merozoites are elongate.

The gametocytes are ovoid to elongate.

== Distribution ==
This species is found in Venezuela.

== Vectors ==
Not known.

== Hosts ==
This species has been found in Anolis species.
