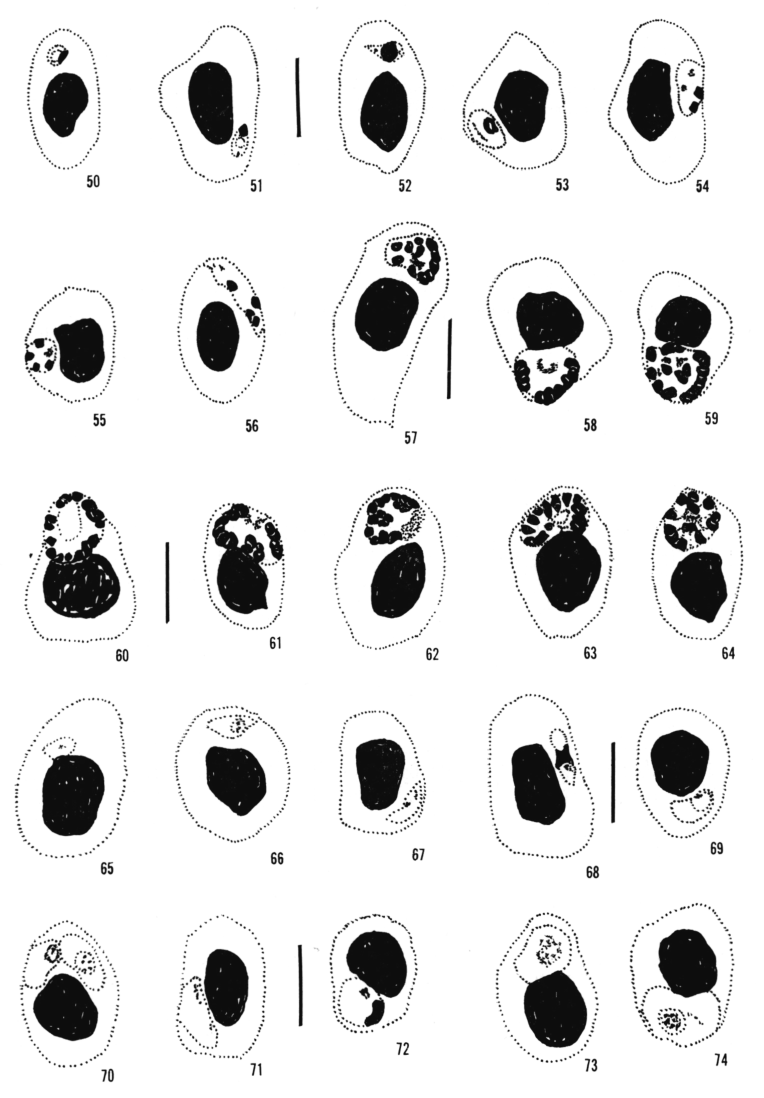

Scientific classification
- Domain: Eukaryota
- Clade: Sar
- Clade: Alveolata
- Phylum: Apicomplexa
- Class: Aconoidasida
- Order: Haemospororida
- Family: Plasmodiidae
- Genus: Plasmodium
- Species: P. brygooi

Binomial name
- Plasmodium brygooi Telford and Landau, 1987

= Plasmodium brygooi =

Species of single-celled organism

Plasmodium brygooi is a parasite of the genus Plasmodium subgenus Lacertamoeba.

Like all Plasmodium species P. brygooi has both vertebrate and insect hosts. The vertebrate hosts for this parasite are lizards.

== Description ==
This species was first described by Telford and Landau in 1987.

== Etymology ==
The name of the species refers to Édouard-Raoul Brygoo, a French parasitologist.

== Geographical occurrence ==
This species is found in Madagascar.

== Clinical features and host pathology ==
The only known host is the chameleon (Chamaeleo brevicornis).
