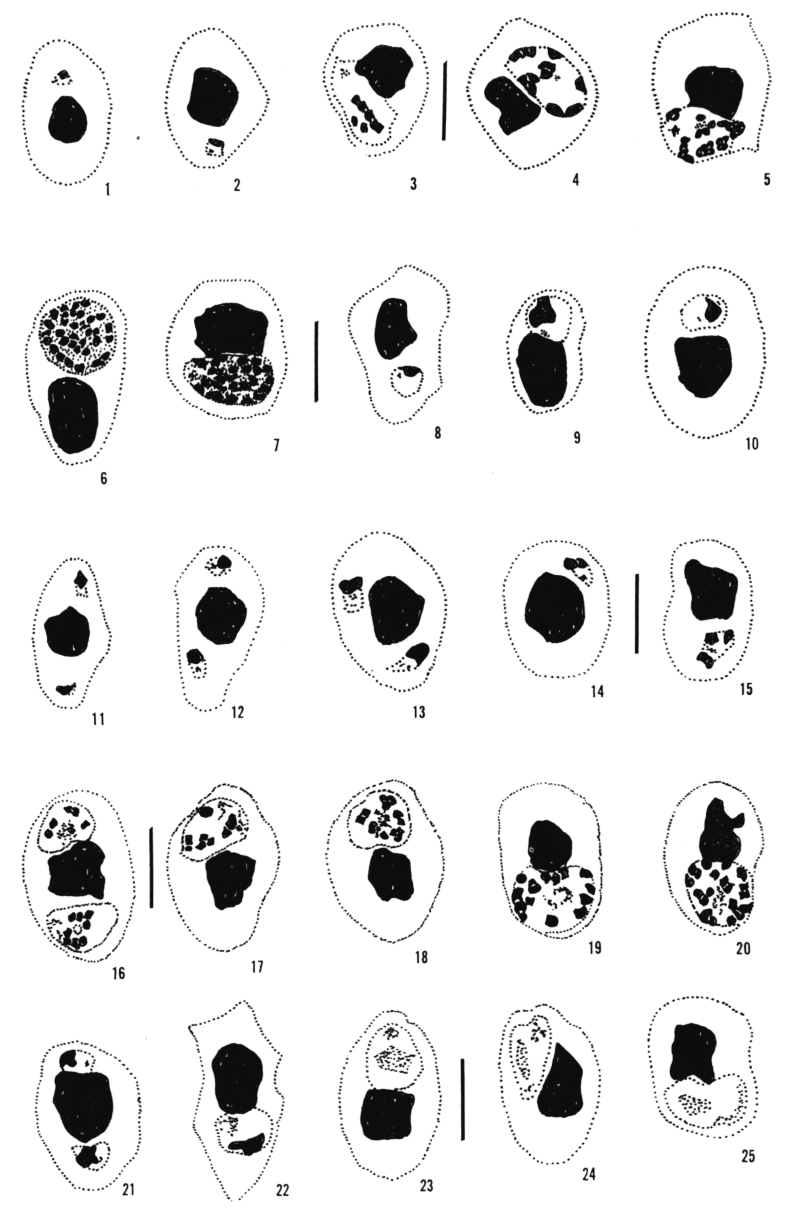

Scientific classification
- Domain: Eukaryota
- Clade: Sar
- Clade: Alveolata
- Phylum: Apicomplexa
- Class: Aconoidasida
- Order: Haemospororida
- Family: Plasmodiidae
- Genus: Plasmodium
- Species: P. robinsoni

Binomial name
- Plasmodium robinsoni Brygoo, 1962

= Plasmodium robinsoni =

Species of single-celled organism

Plasmodium robinsoni is a parasite of the genus Plasmodium subgenus Sauramoeba.

Like all Plasmodium species P. robinsoni has both vertebrate and insect hosts. The vertebrate hosts for this parasite are lizards.

== Description ==
The species was first described by Brygoo in 1962 in the chameleon (Chamaeleo brevicornis).

== Geographical occurrence ==
This species is found in Madagascar.

== Clinical features and host pathology ==
This species is known to infect the chameleon species Chamaeleo brevicornis and Chamaelo parsoni crucifer.
