= Plasmodium loveridgei =

Scientific classification
- Domain: Eukaryota
- Clade: Sar
- Clade: Alveolata
- Phylum: Apicomplexa
- Class: Aconoidasida
- Order: Haemospororida
- Family: Plasmodiidae
- Genus: Plasmodium
- Species: P. loveridgei

Binomial name
- Plasmodium loveridgei Telford, 1984

Species of single-celled organism

Plasmodium loveridgei is a parasite of the genus Plasmodium subgenus Lacertamoeba.

Like all Plasmodium species P. loveridgei has both vertebrate and insect hosts. The vertebrate hosts for this parasite are reptiles.

== Description ==
The parasite was first described by Telford in 1984.

Young schizonts elongate and narrow with acuminate ends. Mature schizonts are polymorphic, are usually larger than host cell nuclei, and give rise to 6-26 merozoites.

Immature gametocytes like young schizonts are elongate and narrow, with acuminate ends. Mature gametocytes are elongate averaging 3 times the host cell nucleus size and have dispersed pigment.

== Geographical occurrence ==
This species is found in the Uluguru Mountains, Tanzania.

== Clinical features and host pathology ==
This species infects the lizard Lygodactylus picturatus.
