= Plasmodium egerniae =

Scientific classification
- Domain: Eukaryota
- Clade: Sar
- Clade: Alveolata
- Phylum: Apicomplexa
- Class: Aconoidasida
- Order: Haemospororida
- Family: Plasmodiidae
- Genus: Plasmodium
- Species: P. egerniae

Binomial name
- Plasmodium egerniae Mackerras, 1961

Species of single-celled organism

Plasmodium egerniae is a parasite of the genus Plasmodium subgenus Sauramoeba.

Like all Plasmodium species P. egerniae has both vertebrate and insect hosts. The vertebrate hosts for this parasite are reptiles.

== Description ==
The parasite was first described by Mackerras in 1961.

Both the schizonts and gametocytes of this species are large and nearly fill the host erythrocyte.

The schizonts measure 14 × 11 micrometres (μm).

== Geographical occurrence ==
This species is found in Queensland, Australia.

== Clinical features and host pathology ==
The only known host of this species is the lizard Egernia major major.
