= Paraplasmodium =

Scientific classification
- Domain: Eukaryota
- Clade: Sar
- Clade: Alveolata
- Phylum: Apicomplexa
- Class: Aconoidasida
- Order: Haemospororida
- Family: Plasmodiidae
- Genus: Plasmodium
- Subgenus: Paraplasmodium; Telford, 1988

Species
- See text

Subgenus of single-celled organisms

Paraplasmodium is a subgenus of the genus Plasmodium - all of which are parasitic eukaryotes. The subgenus was created by Telford in 1988. Species in this subgenus infect lizards.

== Species ==
- Plasmodium chiricahuae
- Plasmodium mexicanum
- Plasmodium pifanoi
