= Plasmodium zonuriae =

Scientific classification
- Domain: Eukaryota
- Clade: Sar
- Clade: Alveolata
- Phylum: Apicomplexa
- Class: Aconoidasida
- Order: Haemospororida
- Family: Plasmodiidae
- Genus: Plasmodium
- Species: P. zonuriae

Binomial name
- Plasmodium zonuriae Pienaar, 1962

Species of single-celled organism

Plasmodium zonuriae is a parasite of the genus Plasmodium subgenus Lacertamoeba.

As in all Plasmodium species, P. zonuriae has both vertebrate and insect hosts. The vertebrate hosts for this parasite are reptiles.

== Taxonomy ==
The parasite was first described by Pienaar in 1962.

== Distribution ==
This species is found in Africa. P. zonuriae and Plasmodium cordyli are the only species of Plasmodium reported to infect cordylid lizards in Africa.

== Vectors ==
Not known.

== Hosts ==
This species infects cordylid lizards (Cordylidae).
