= Plasmodium chiricahuae =

Scientific classification
- Domain: Eukaryota
- Clade: Sar
- Clade: Alveolata
- Phylum: Apicomplexa
- Class: Aconoidasida
- Order: Haemospororida
- Family: Plasmodiidae
- Genus: Plasmodium
- Species: P. chiricahuae

Binomial name
- Plasmodium chiricahuae Telford, 1970

Species of single-celled organism

Plasmodium chiricahuae is a parasite of the genus Plasmodium subgenus Paraplasmodium.

Like all Plasmodium species P. chiricahuae has both vertebrate and insect hosts. The vertebrate hosts for this parasite are reptiles.

== Description ==
The schizonts rarely exceed the size of the nucleus of the cell and produce 4-10 merozoites.

The gametocytes are large (3-6 times the size of the nucleus of an uninfected cell) and almost fill the erythrocyte.

== Distribution ==
This species is found in the south-western United States and probably also in northern Mexico.

== Hosts ==
This species infects spiny lizards of the genus Sceloporus.
