= Plasmodium lepidoptiformis =

Scientific classification
- Domain: Eukaryota
- Clade: Sar
- Clade: Alveolata
- Phylum: Apicomplexa
- Class: Aconoidasida
- Order: Haemospororida
- Family: Plasmodiidae
- Genus: Plasmodium
- Species: P. lepidoptiformis

Binomial name
- Plasmodium lepidoptiformis Telford and Telford, 2003

Species of parasite

Plasmodium lepidoptiformis is a parasite of the genus Plasmodium.

Like all Plasmodium species P. lepidoptiformis has both vertebrate and insect hosts. The vertebrate hosts for this parasite are lizards.

== Description ==
This species was described by Telford and Telford in 2003.

== Distribution ==
It is found in Venezuela.

== Hosts ==
The only known vertebrate host is the lizard Kentropyx calcarata.
