= Plasmodium cnemaspi =

Scientific classification
- Domain: Eukaryota
- Clade: Sar
- Clade: Alveolata
- Phylum: Apicomplexa
- Class: Aconoidasida
- Order: Haemospororida
- Family: Plasmodiidae
- Genus: Plasmodium
- Species: P. cnemaspi

Binomial name
- Plasmodium cnemaspi Telford, 1984

Species of single-celled organism

Plasmodium cnemaspi is a parasite of the genus Plasmodium subgenus Sauramoeba.

Like all Plasmodium species P. cnemaspi has both vertebrate and insect hosts. The vertebrate hosts for this parasite are lizards.

== Description ==
The parasite was first described by Telford in 1984.

== Geographical occurrence ==
This species is found in the Uluguru Mountains, Tanzania.

== Clinical features and host pathology ==
This species infects the lizard Cnemaspis africana.
