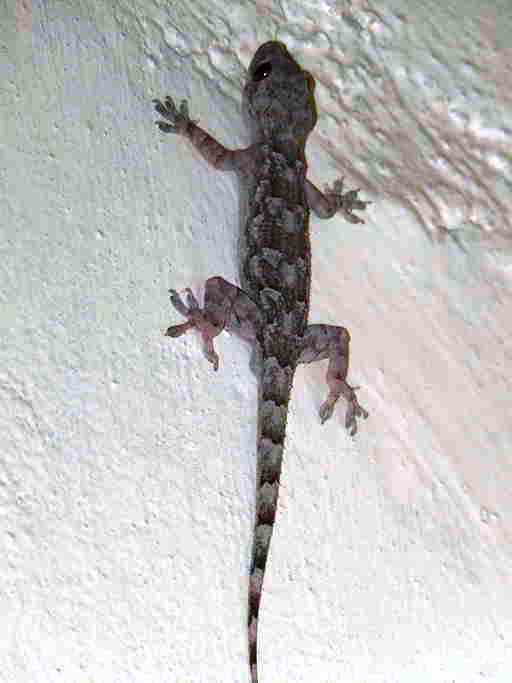

Conservation status
- Least Concern (IUCN 3.1)

Scientific classification
- Domain: Eukaryota
- Kingdom: Animalia
- Phylum: Chordata
- Class: Reptilia
- Order: Squamata
- Infraorder: Gekkota
- Family: Gekkonidae
- Genus: Hemidactylus
- Species: H. platycephalus

Binomial name
- Hemidactylus platycephalus Peters, 1854

= Hemidactylus platycephalus =

Species of lizard

Hemidactylus platycephalus, also known as the tree gecko, flathead leaf-toed gecko, or Baobab gecko, is a species of gecko. It is widely distributed in eastern Africa between Somalia in the north and Mozambique and Madagascar in the south.
