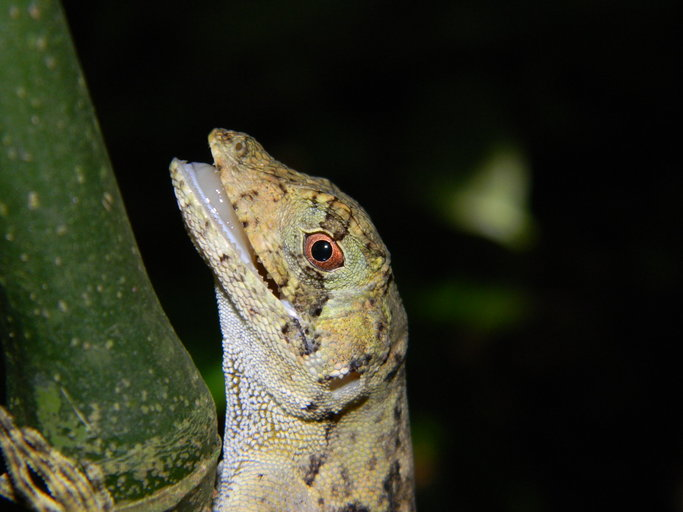

Conservation status
- Least Concern (IUCN 3.1)

Scientific classification
- Kingdom: Animalia
- Phylum: Chordata
- Class: Reptilia
- Order: Squamata
- Suborder: Iguania
- Family: Dactyloidae
- Genus: Anolis
- Species: A. capito

Binomial name
- Anolis capito Peters, 1863

= Anolis capito =

Species of lizard

Anolis capito, the bighead anole, is a species of lizard in the family Dactyloidae. The species is found in Mexico, Guatemala, Belize, Honduras, Nicaragua, Costa Rica, and Panama. Although they are active all day, it seems that these enigmatic anoles spend the majority of their time in the shade, where they reside low on trees in a shady rain forest. The mean temperature of the body is 28.8 +/- 0.5 degrees Celsius, meaning that it is 1.3 degrees Celsius higher than the substrate and 1.7 degrees Celsius higher than the air. Compared to males, females are larger and reach sexual maturity at a larger SVL.

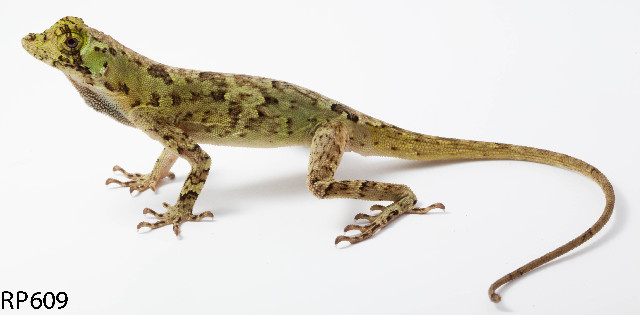

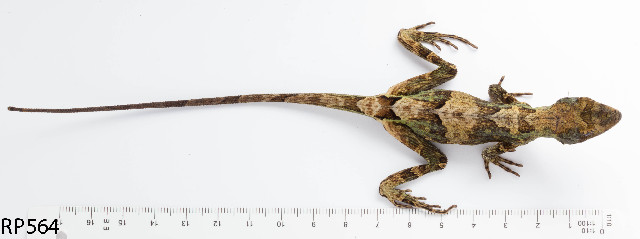

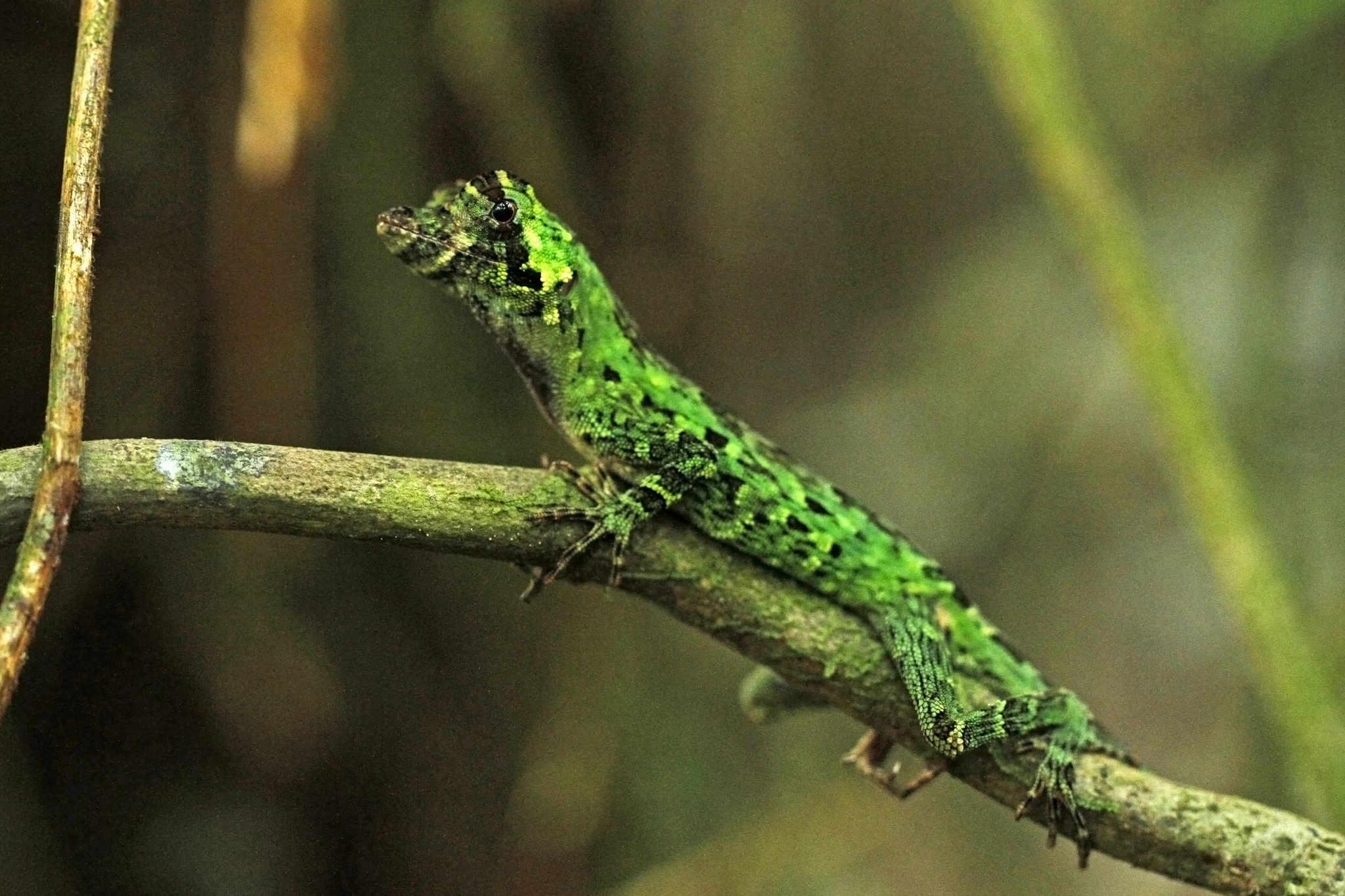
