= Plasmodium floridense =

Scientific classification
- Domain: Eukaryota
- Clade: Sar
- Clade: Alveolata
- Phylum: Apicomplexa
- Class: Aconoidasida
- Order: Haemospororida
- Family: Plasmodiidae
- Genus: Plasmodium
- Species: P. floridense

Binomial name
- Plasmodium floridense Thompson and Huff, 1944

Species of single-celled organism

Plasmodium floridense is a parasite of the genus Plasmodium subgenus Lacertamoeba. As in all Plasmodium species, P. floridense has both vertebrate and insect hosts. The vertebrate hosts for this parasite are lizards.

== Description ==
This species was described by Thompson and Huff in 1944.

Schizonts are 1.5 -2.0 times the size of the nucleus of an uninfected erythrocyte. They produce 8-24 merozoites.

The gametocytes are of a similar size.

== Distribution ==
This organism is found in an area stretching continuously from the southern United States to Panama. It is also found in the Caribbean.

== Hosts ==
It infects lizards of the genera Anolis (Anolis carolinensis, Anolis gundlachi Anolis sabanus, Anolis sagrei) and Sceloporus undulatus.

The prevalence of infection in Anolis sagrei in Florida is high (46%) but the median parasitaemia in infected hosts is low (0.3%).
