= Plasmodium tanzaniae =

Scientific classification
- Domain: Eukaryota
- Clade: Sar
- Clade: Alveolata
- Phylum: Apicomplexa
- Class: Aconoidasida
- Order: Haemospororida
- Family: Plasmodiidae
- Genus: Plasmodium
- Species: P. tanzaniae

Binomial name
- Plasmodium tanzaniae Telford, 1988

Species of single-celled organism

Plasmodium tanzaniae is a parasite of the genus Plasmodium.

Like all Plasmodium species P. tanzaniae has both vertebrate and insect hosts. The vertebrate hosts for this parasite are reptiles.

== Description ==
The parasite was first described by Telford in 1988.

== Geographical occurrence ==
This species was described in Tanzania.

== Clinical features and host pathology ==
The only known hosts are chameleons (Chamaeleo species)
