= Plasmodium holaspi =

Scientific classification
- Domain: Eukaryota
- Clade: Sar
- Clade: Alveolata
- Phylum: Apicomplexa
- Class: Aconoidasida
- Order: Haemospororida
- Family: Plasmodiidae
- Genus: Plasmodium
- Species: P. holaspi

Binomial name
- Plasmodium holaspi Telford, 1986

Species of single-celled organism

Plasmodium holaspi is a parasite of the genus Plasmodium subgenus Lacertamoeba.

Like all Plasmodium species P. holaspi has both vertebrate and insect hosts. The vertebrate hosts for this parasite are reptiles.

== Description ==
The parasite was first described by Telford in 1986.

== Geographical occurrence ==
This species is found in Tanzania.

== Clinical features and host pathology ==
This parasite infects the flying lacertid Holaspis guentheri.
