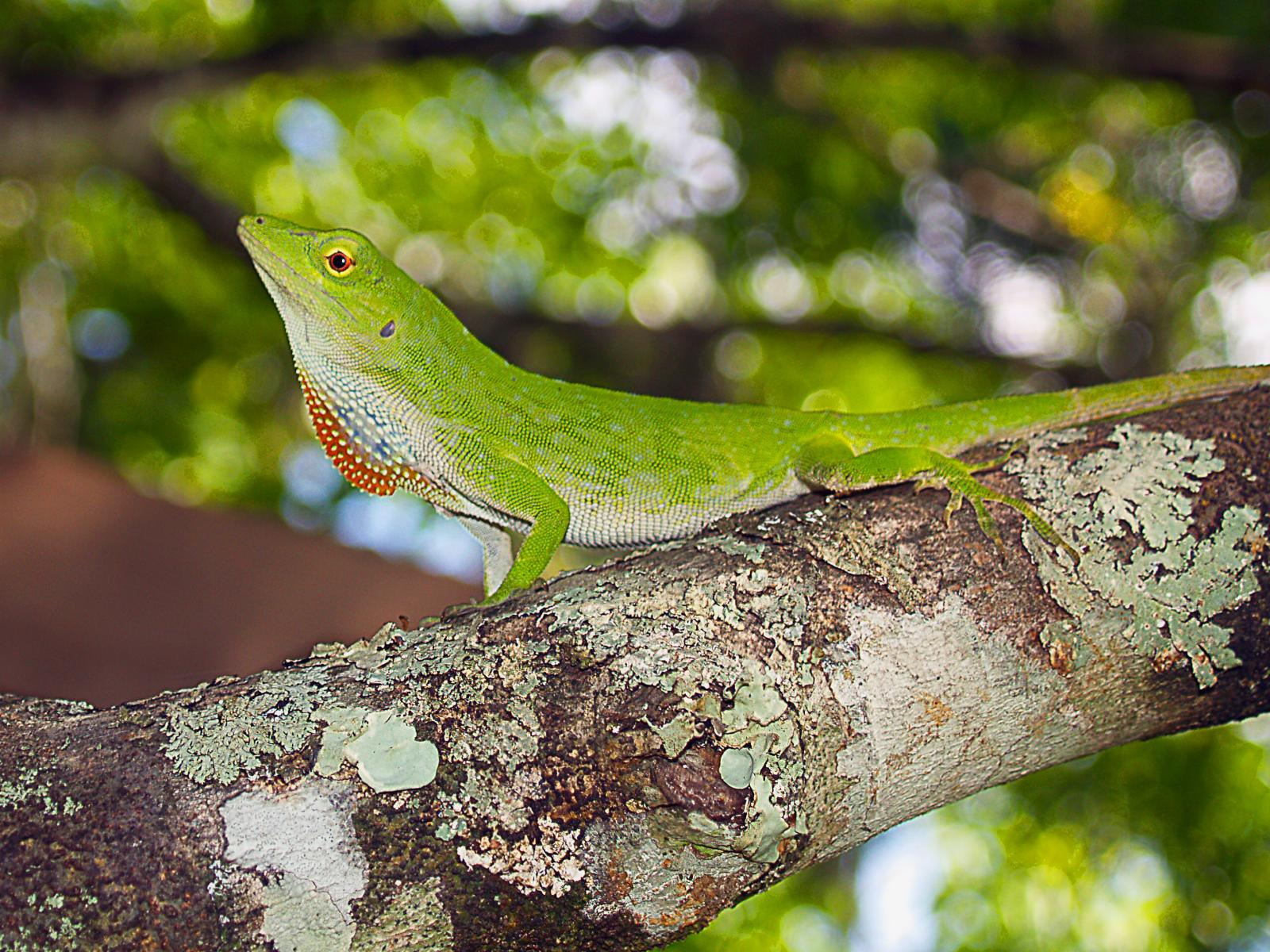

Conservation status
- Least Concern (IUCN 3.1)

Scientific classification
- Kingdom: Animalia
- Phylum: Chordata
- Class: Reptilia
- Order: Squamata
- Suborder: Iguania
- Family: Dactyloidae
- Genus: Anolis
- Species: A. biporcatus

Binomial name
- Anolis biporcatus Wiegmann, 1834

Synonyms
- Norops biporcatus

= Anolis biporcatus =

Neotropical green anole

Species of anole

Anolis biporcatus, also known as the neotropical green anole or giant green anole, is a species of anole. It is found in forests, both disturbed and undisturbed, in Mexico, Central America, Colombia and Venezuela. More southern populations, in southwestern Colombia and western Ecuador, were recognized as a separate species, A. parvauritus, in 2017.

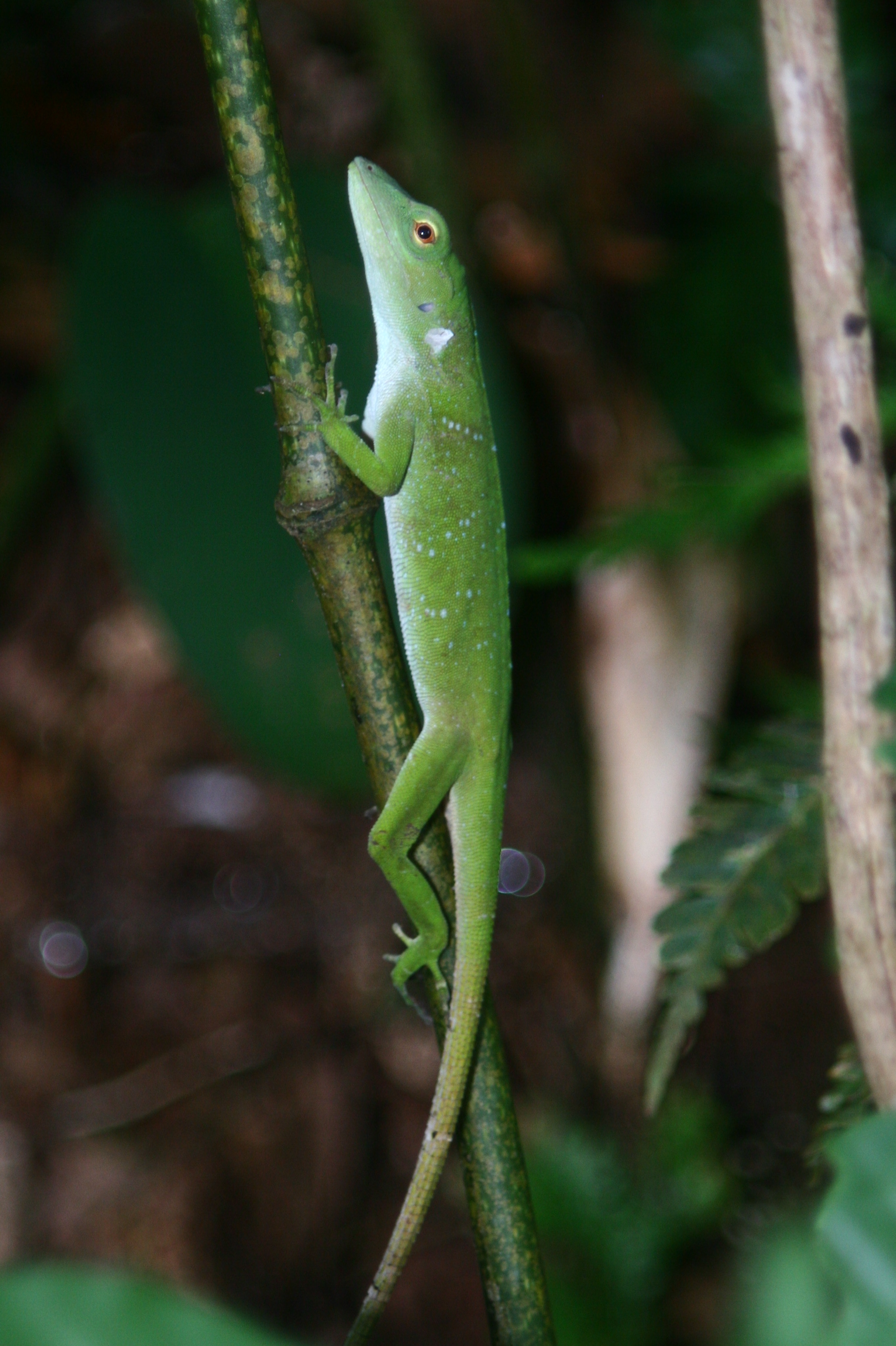
Neotropical green anole on vegetation

As suggested by its common names, the neotropical green or giant green anole is mostly green in color and relatively large, among the largest anoles in the mainland of the Americas. Males have a snout–vent length of about 7.0–10.3 cm (2.8–4.1 in) and the females, which grow slightly larger, about 7.0–10.8 cm (2.8–4.3 in). In general, there is little sexual dimorphism in this species. The tail is roughly double the length of the snout-to-vent.

== See also ==
- List of Anolis lizards
