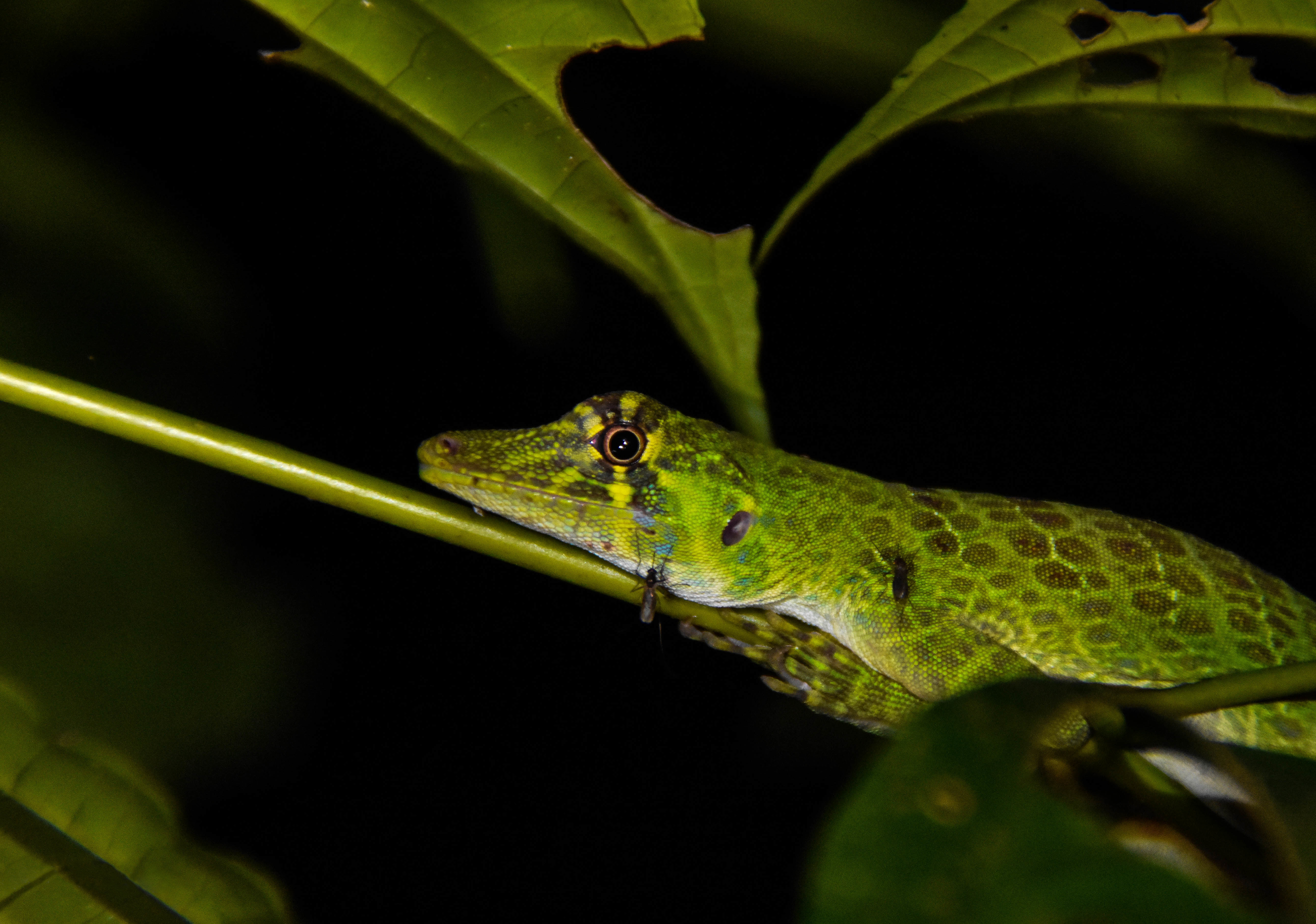

Conservation status
- Least Concern (IUCN 3.1)

Scientific classification
- Kingdom: Animalia
- Phylum: Chordata
- Class: Reptilia
- Order: Squamata
- Suborder: Iguania
- Family: Dactyloidae
- Genus: Anolis
- Species: A. frenatus

Binomial name
- Anolis frenatus Cope, 1899

= Anolis frenatus =

Species of lizard

Anolis frenatus, the bridled anole, is a species of lizard in the family Dactyloidae. The species is found in Costa Rica, Panama, and Colombia.
