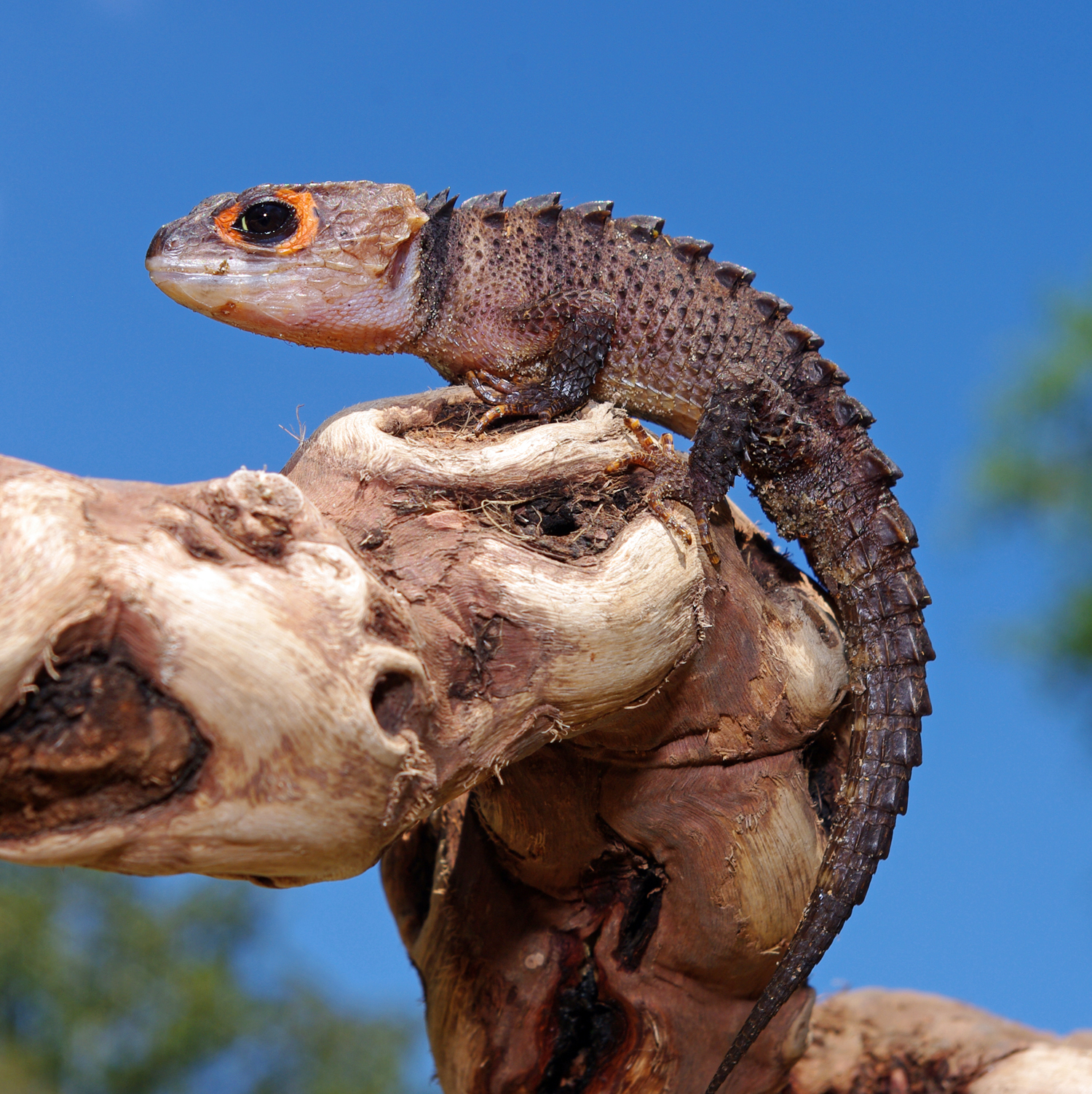

Conservation status
- Least Concern (IUCN 3.1)

Scientific classification
- Kingdom: Animalia
- Phylum: Chordata
- Class: Reptilia
- Order: Squamata
- Family: Scincidae
- Genus: Tribolonotus
- Species: T. gracilis

Binomial name
- Tribolonotus gracilis de Rooij, 1909

= Red-eyed crocodile skink =

Species of lizard

Tribolonotus gracilis, commonly known as the red-eyed crocodile skink or New Guinea crocodile skink, is a species of skink that is endemic to New Guinea, where it lives in tropical rainforest habitats. It was first described by Nelly de Rooij in 1909. It is sometimes kept as an exotic pet.

== Behavior ==
Tribolonotus gracilis is one of the few species of skinks that vocalize when in distress. When startled, they tend to freeze and have been known to "play dead" (even when handled).

== Reproduction ==
A male red-eyed crocodile skink can be identified by the white pads (pores) on his feet. Female red-eyed crocodile skinks have two working ovaries, but only the right oviduct is functional; therefore, eggs from the left ovary must migrate across the body cavity prior to oviposition. She often curls around the egg and aggressively defends it when approached by a perceived threat. If it is uncovered, she will cover it back up. Male crocodile skinks battle other males. Red-eyed crocodile skinks lay only one egg per clutch which is why it receives such heavy protection from both of its parents.

== Diet ==
Red-eyed crocodile skinks are carnivorous with a particular taste for insects. The standard diet of red eye skinks consists of grubs, crickets, and most worms such as earth, wax, and meal. Animals in captivity are typically fed vitamin D3 to help maintain their scales and health, however overconsumption can lead to lethargy and illness. These animals typically eat at dusk and dawn. Infants will only consume one insect at each mealtime totaling two per day. Adults change the pattern slightly typically only consuming three insects within a 48-hour window.

== Health risks ==
Red-eyed crocodile skinks are typically found in Indonesia. As of December 2019, there have been increasing reports of Aeromonas hydrophila infections in these skinks. A study was conducted after a number of skinks who were shipped overseas to be sold as pets all perished along the boat due to unknown illness. The study concluded that Aeromonas hydrophila was present in these specimens and was likely to be spreading to more animals in the Indonesian region thanks to the aquatic environment that the skinks typically inhabit being the ideal breeding ground for the bacterium. Additionally the colder climate is believed to have weakened the species immune system making them more susceptible to the disease. Skinks owned as pets are less likely to suffer from this ailment depending on which breeder they were acquired from; however, they are commonly susceptible to metabolic bone disease and respiratory infection.
