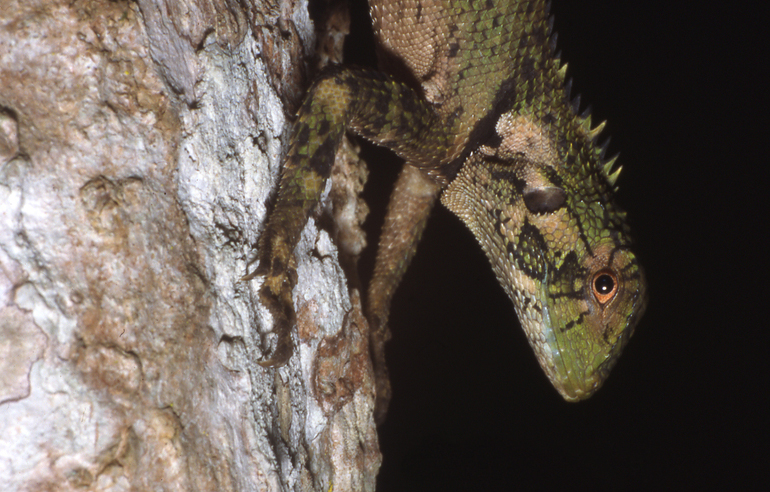

Conservation status
- Least Concern (IUCN 3.1)

Scientific classification
- Kingdom: Animalia
- Phylum: Chordata
- Class: Reptilia
- Order: Squamata
- Suborder: Iguania
- Family: Tropiduridae
- Genus: Plica
- Species: P. umbra

Binomial name
- Plica umbra (Linnaeus, 1758)

= Plica umbra =

Species of lizard

Plica umbra, the blue-lipped tree lizard or harlequin racerunner, is a species of lizard in the family Tropiduridae. The species is found in South America (Colombia, Venezuela, Guyana, Suriname, French Guiana, Brazil, Bolivia, Peru, and Ecuador).
