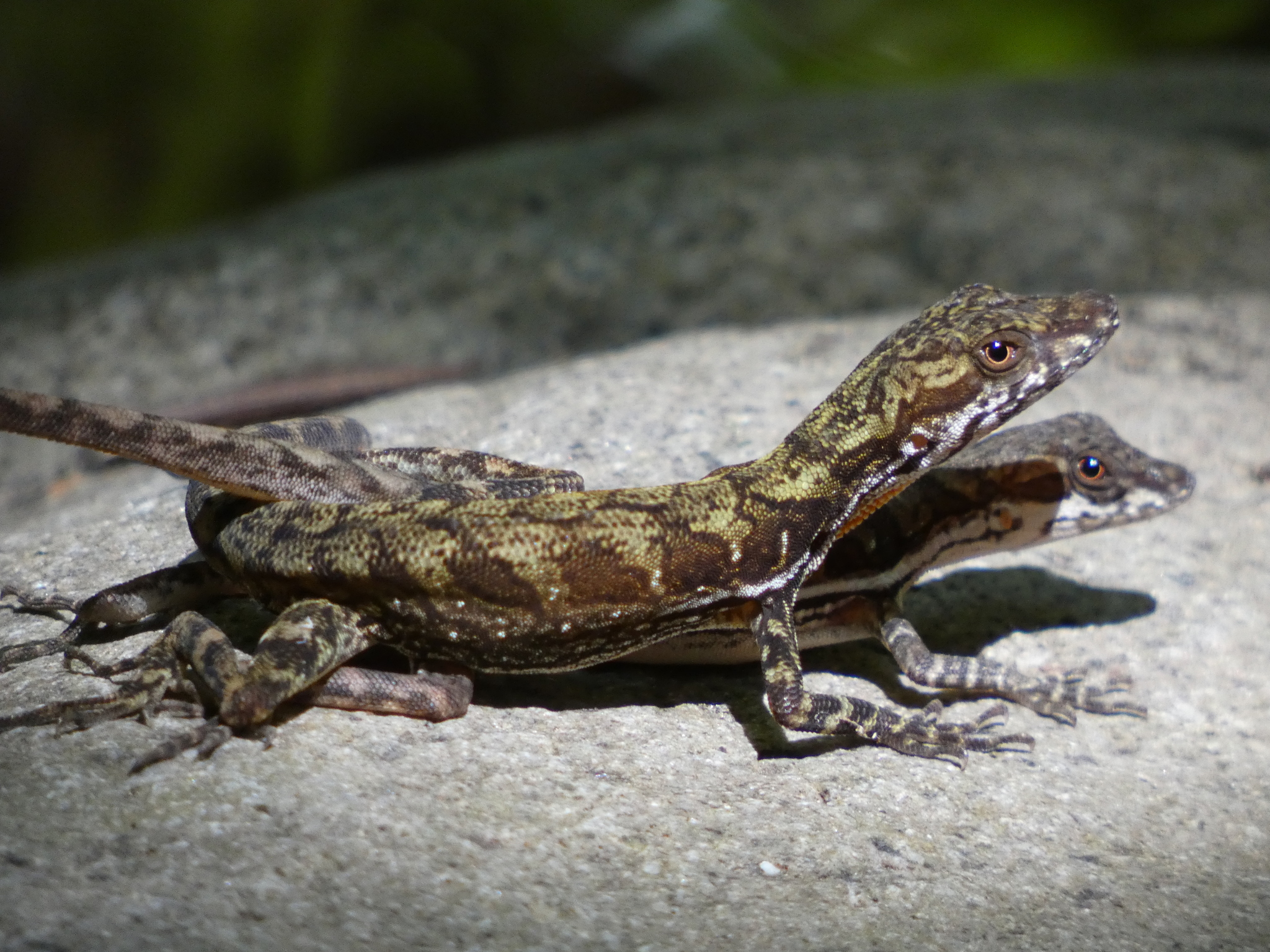
- A male and female copulating

Conservation status
- Least Concern (IUCN 3.1)

Scientific classification
- Kingdom: Animalia
- Phylum: Chordata
- Class: Reptilia
- Order: Squamata
- Suborder: Iguania
- Family: Dactyloidae
- Genus: Anolis
- Species: A. lionotus

Binomial name
- Anolis lionotus Cope, 1861

= Anolis lionotus =

Species of lizard

Anolis lionotus, the lion anole, is a species of lizard in the family Dactyloidae. The species is found in Panama.
