= Phyllodactylus ventralis =

Conservation status
- Least Concern (IUCN 3.1)

Scientific classification
- Kingdom: Animalia
- Phylum: Chordata
- Class: Reptilia
- Order: Squamata
- Suborder: Gekkota
- Family: Phyllodactylidae
- Genus: Phyllodactylus
- Species: P. ventralis

Binomial name
- Phyllodactylus ventralis O'Shaughnessy, 1875

Synonyms
- Phyllodactylus mülleri; Phyllodactylus underwoodi

Species of lizard

Phyllodactylus ventralis, the Margarita leaf-toed gecko, is a species of lizard found in northern Colombia, Venezuela (including Margarita Island), and according to some sources, also Grenada and other Windward Islands.
