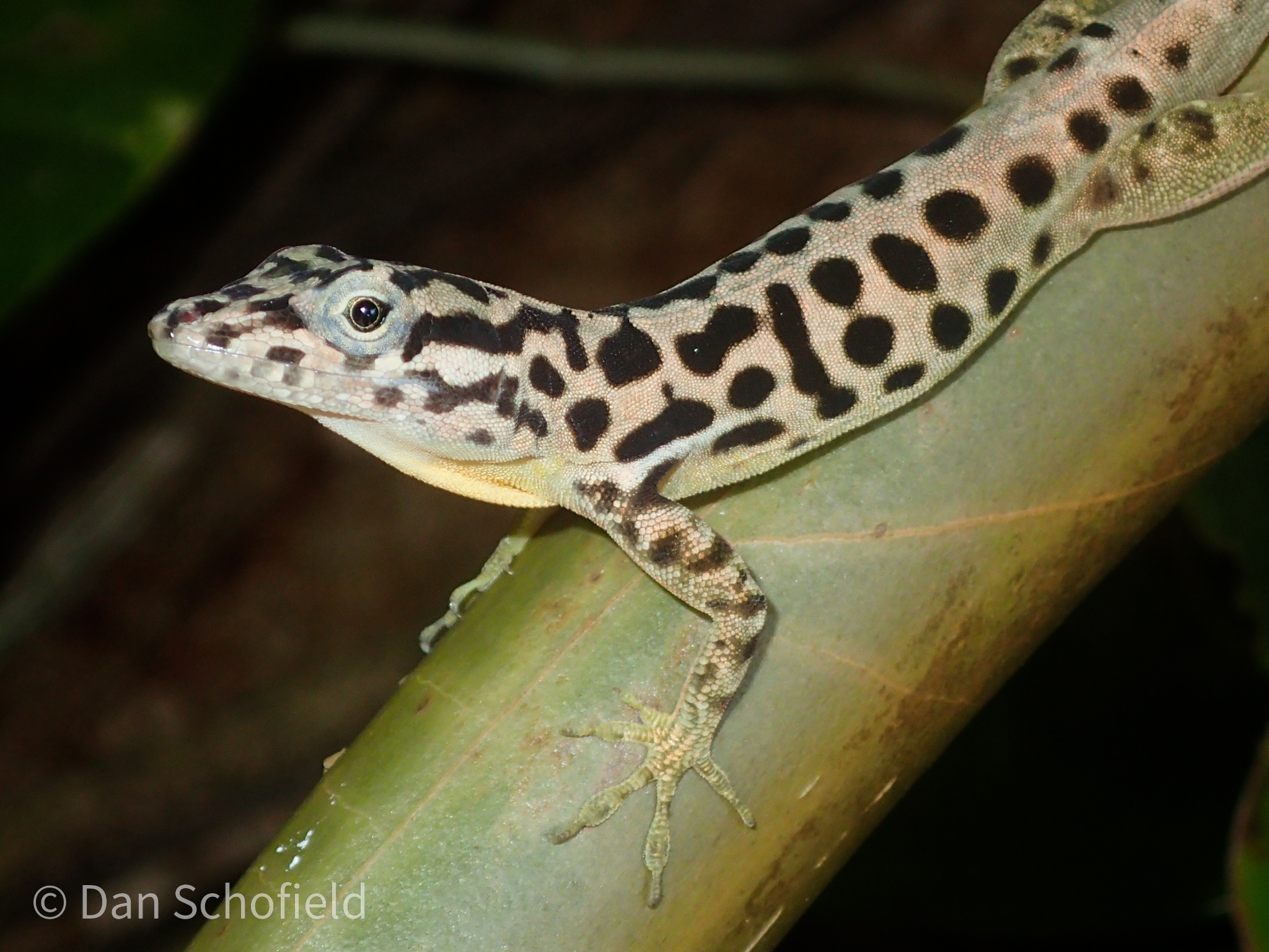

Conservation status
- Near Threatened (IUCN 3.1)

Scientific classification
- Kingdom: Animalia
- Phylum: Chordata
- Class: Reptilia
- Order: Squamata
- Suborder: Iguania
- Family: Anolidae
- Genus: Anolis
- Species: A. sabanus

Binomial name
- Anolis sabanus Garman, 1887

Synonyms
- Anolis sabanis — Baumeister, 2000

= Anolis sabanus =

Species of lizard

Anolis sabanus, the Saba anole or Saban anole, is a species of anole lizard that is endemic to the island of Saba, a Dutch municipality in the Caribbean Lesser Antilles. It is a medium-sized anole, with males growing to a snout–vent length of 69 mm (2.7 in) and females to 50 mm (2.0 in). It is considered by the IUCN to be near-threatened.

== Taxonomy ==
Anolis sabanus was formally described in 1887 by the American zoologist Samuel Garman based on specimens from Saba. The species is named after the island to which it is endemic. It has the English common names Saba anole and Saban anole.

Soon after being described, the species was synonymised with A. leachii and A. alliaceus, only being raised to species status again in 1914. It was again demoted in 1959 to a subspecies of A. bimaculatus by Underwood, an arrangement that lasted until it was raised back to species status in 1972 by Lazell.

== Description ==
Saba anoles are medium-sized for their genus, growing to a snout–vent length of 69 mm (2.7 in) in males and 50 mm (2.0 in) in females. Males and females both have pale grey to tan-coloured bodies and pale yellow-green to orange-tinted dewlaps, but the males can be differentiated by additional dark blotches on the dorsum. Females additionally have an overall lighter colouration and a stripe or mottled pattern along the centre of the dorsum.

== Distribution ==
The Saban anole is, as the name suggests, endemic to the Dutch municipality of Saba in the Caribbean Lesser Antilles. The species is very common on the island and inhabits all but the most arid habitats at elevations of up to 870 metres (2,850 ft). The species was documented from Sint Eustatius in 2016, with one adult being found near the port of Oranjestad. The solitary specimen was likely carried there by a ship from Saba and was euthanized soon afterwards.

It is omnivorous and eats arthropods, flowers, fruits, and nectar.

The Saban anole is considered by the IUCN to be near-threatened. Although it is extremely common within its small range and the entirety of Saba is protected as the Saba National Land Park, the species could experience a population collapse in the event that non-native anoles are introduced to Saba.
