= Anolis parvauritus =

Scientific classification
- Kingdom: Animalia
- Phylum: Chordata
- Class: Reptilia
- Order: Squamata
- Suborder: Iguania
- Family: Dactyloidae
- Genus: Anolis
- Species: A. parvauritus

Binomial name
- Anolis parvauritus (Williams, 1966)

Species of lizard

Anolis parvauritus the giant green anole or neotropical green anole, is a species of lizard in the family Dactyloidae. The species is found in Colombia and Ecuador.
