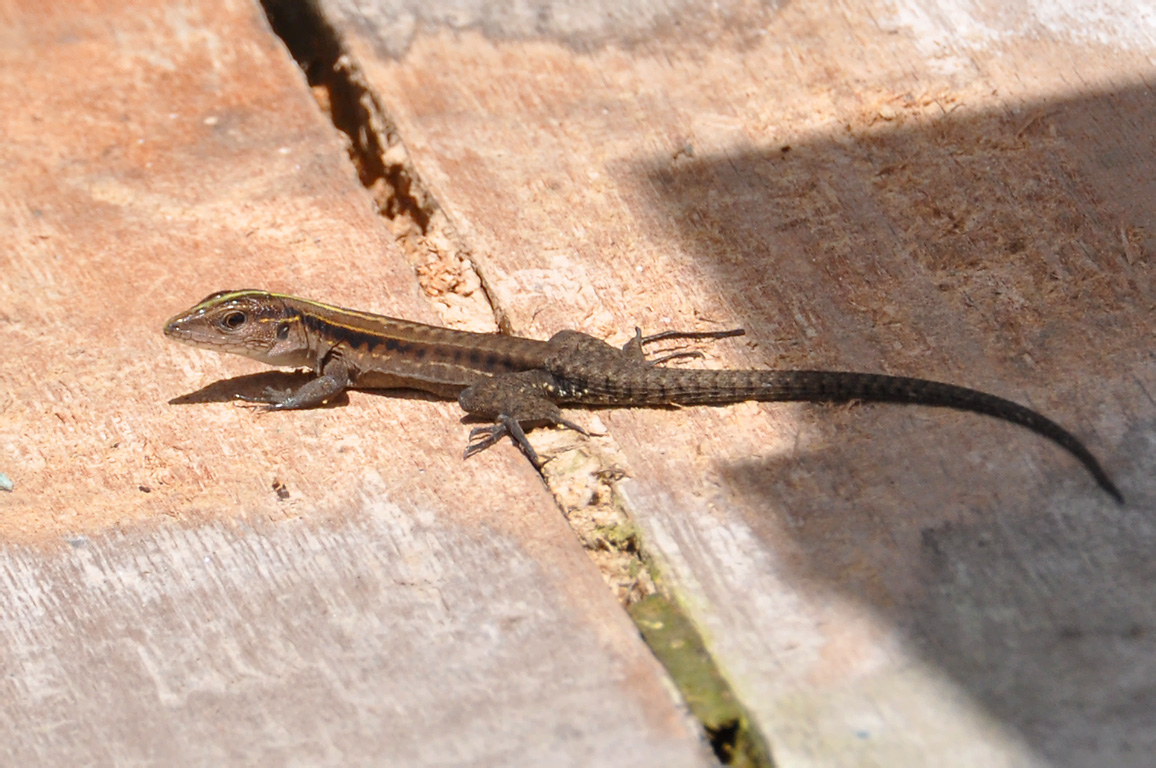

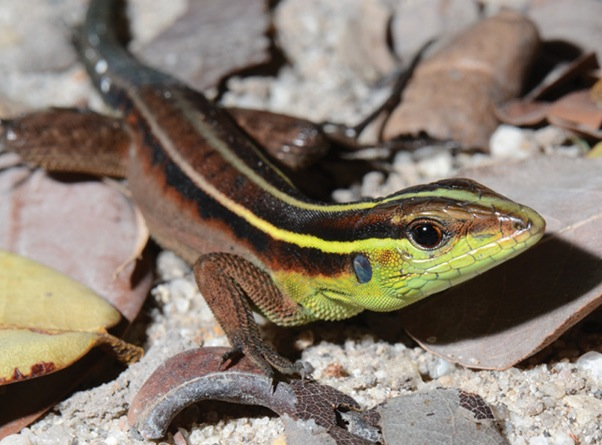
- in Brazil.

Scientific classification
- Domain: Eukaryota
- Kingdom: Animalia
- Phylum: Chordata
- Class: Reptilia
- Order: Squamata
- Family: Teiidae
- Genus: Kentropyx
- Species: K. calcarata

Binomial name
- Kentropyx calcarata Spix, 1825

= Kentropyx calcarata =

Species of lizard

Kentropyx calcarata, commonly known as the striped forest whiptail, is a species of lizard endemic to South America.

== Behavior ==
Kentropyx calcarata commonly participate in communal nesting. While no clear reasoning has been found, a recent study suggested that communally incubated eggs took up less water while also yielding larger offsprings.

== Geographic range ==
The striped forest whiptail lives in the South American countries of Brazil, Bolivia, Venezuela and northeastern South American countries such as French Guiana and Suriname.

== Parasites ==
Kentropyx calcarata specimens are sometimes plagued by the parasitic protist, Plasmodium lepidoptiformis.
