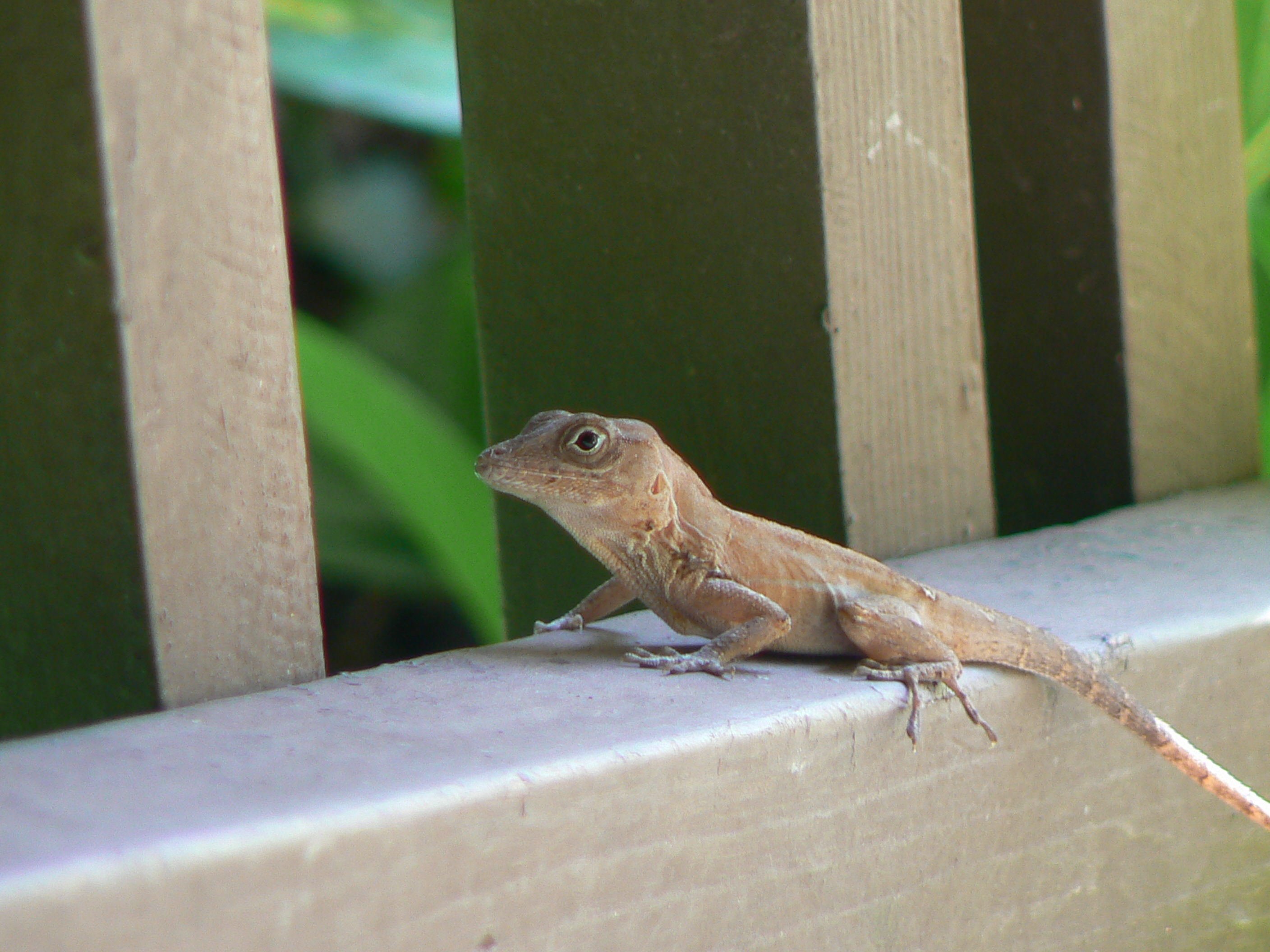

Conservation status
- Least Concern (IUCN 3.1)

Scientific classification
- Kingdom: Animalia
- Phylum: Chordata
- Class: Reptilia
- Order: Squamata
- Suborder: Iguania
- Family: Dactyloidae
- Genus: Anolis
- Species: A. cybotes

Binomial name
- Anolis cybotes (Cope, 1862)

= Anolis cybotes =

Species of reptile

Anolis cybotes, the large-headed anole, Tiburon stout anole, or Hispaniolan stout anole, is a species of anole endemic to the Tiburon Peninsula of Haiti. Reports from other places likely refer to other species that were formerly included in Anolis cybotes. This species gets its name from the male's strangely large head. It is often brownish in color with lighter stripes on the flanks.

Males grow to 79 mm (3.1 in) and females to 57 mm (2.2 in) in snout–vent length.

== See also ==
- List of Anolis lizards
