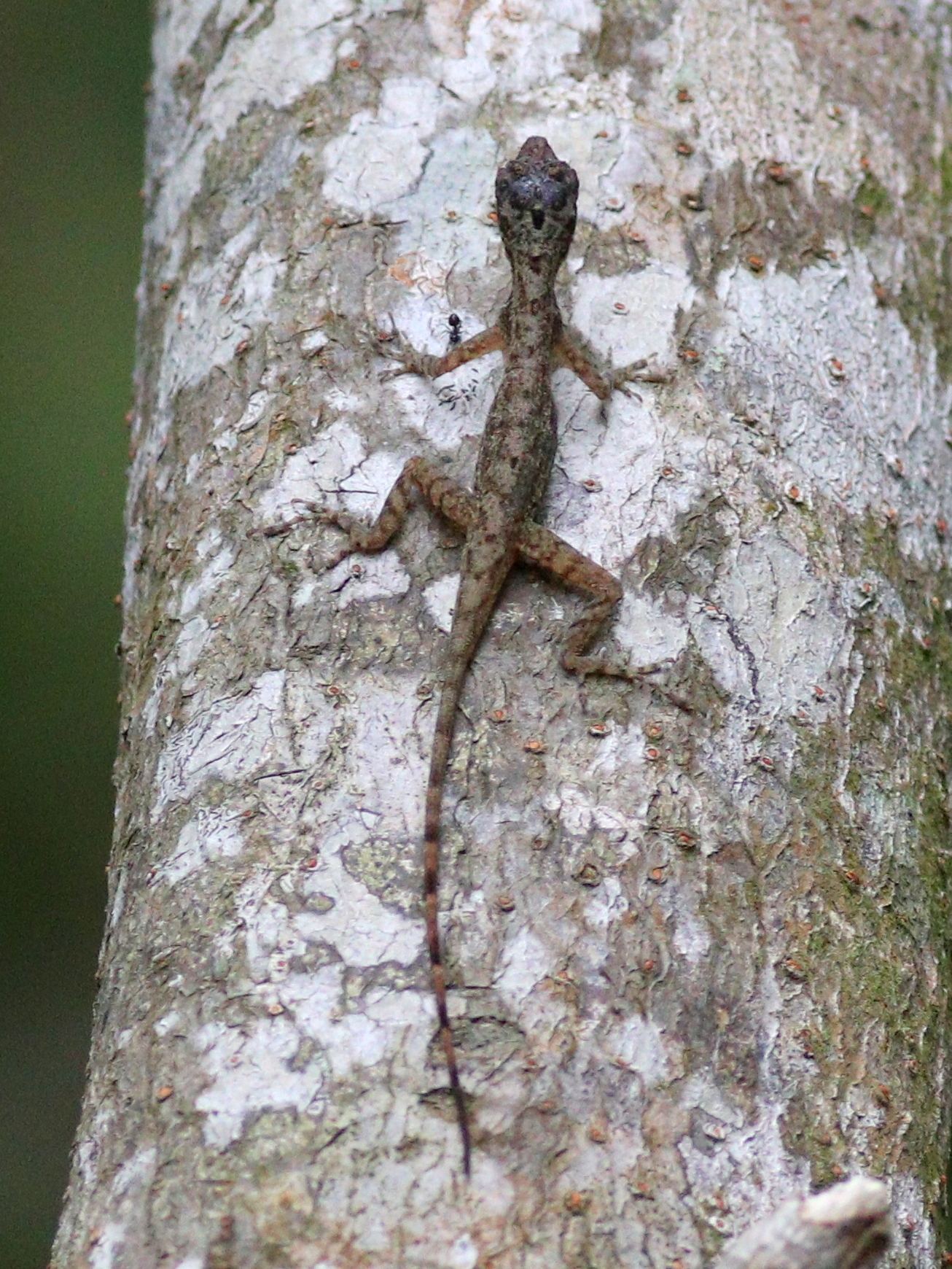

Conservation status
- Least Concern (IUCN 3.1)

Scientific classification
- Kingdom: Animalia
- Phylum: Chordata
- Class: Reptilia
- Order: Squamata
- Suborder: Iguania
- Family: Dactyloidae
- Genus: Anolis
- Species: A. limifrons

Binomial name
- Anolis limifrons Cope, 1862

Synonyms
- Anolis (Dracontura) limifrons Cope, 1862; Anolis trochilus Cope, 1871; Anolis pulchripes W. Peters, 1874; Anolis rodriguezii Bocourt, 1874; Anolis bransfordii Cope, 1874; Anolis rivieri Thominot, 1882; Anolis godmani Boulenger, 1885; Anolis biscutiger Taylor, 1956; Norops limifrons — G. Köhler, 2000

= Anolis limifrons =

Species of lizard

Anolis limifrons, also known commonly as the slender anole or the border anole, is a species of lizard in the family Dactyloidae. The species is native to Central America. It grows to around 12 cm (4.7 in) (TL).

== Geographic range ==
A. limifrons is found in Guatemala, Belize, Honduras, Nicaragua, Costa Rica, and Panama.

== Reproduction ==
A. limifrons is oviparous.
