= Behavior-altering parasite =

Parasitic creature

Behavior-altering parasites are parasites capable of causing changes in the behavior of their hosts species to enhance their transmission, sometimes directly affecting the hosts' decision-making and behavior control mechanisms. By way of example, a parasite that reproduces in an intermediate host may require, as part of their life cycle, that the intermediate host be eaten by a predator at a higher trophic level, and some parasites are capable of altering the behavior of the intermediate host to make such predation more likely; a mechanism that has been called parasite increased trophic facilitation or parasite increased trophic transmission. Examples can be found in bacteria, protozoa, viruses, and animals. Parasites may perform bodyguard manipulation to increase protection of the parasites or their offspring.

Among the behavioral changes caused by parasites is carelessness, making their hosts easier prey. The protozoan Toxoplasma gondii, for example, infects small rodents and causes them to become careless and may cause them to become attracted to the smell of cat urine, both of which increase their risk of predation and the parasite's chance of infecting a cat, its definitive host.

Parasites may alter the host's behavior by infecting the host's central nervous system, or by altering its neurochemical communication (studied in neuroparasitology).

== Mechanisms ==
=== Direct and indirect manipulation ===
Parasite manipulations can be either direct or indirect. Indirect manipulation is the most frequent method used by behavior-altering parasites, while the direct approach is far less common. Direct manipulation is when the parasite itself affects the host and induces a behavioral response, for example by creating neuroactive compounds that stimulate a response in the host's central nervous system (CNS), a method mostly practiced by parasites that reside within the CNS. Affecting the host's neural system is complicated and manipulation includes initiating immune cascades in the host. However, determination of the causative factor is difficult, especially whether the behavioral change is the result of direct manipulation from the parasite, or an indirect response of the host's immune system. A direct approach to behavioral manipulation is often very costly for the parasite, which results in a trade-off between the benefits of the manipulation (e.g., fitness increase) and the energy it costs. The more common approach for parasites is to indirectly induce behavioral responses by interacting with the host's immune system to create the necessary neuroactive compounds to induce a desired behavioral response. Parasites can also indirectly affect the behavior of their hosts by disturbing their metabolism, development, or immunity. Parasitic castrators drastically modify their hosts' metabolism and reproduction, sometimes by secreting castrating hormones, changing their behavior and physiology to benefit the parasite.

The ways in which parasites induce behavioral changes in hosts have been compared to the way a neurobiologist would effect a similar change in a lab. A scientist may stimulate a certain pathway in order to produce a specific behavior, such as increased appetite or lowered anxiety; parasites also produce specific behavioral changes in their hosts, but rather than stimulate specific neurological pathways, they appear to target broader areas of the central nervous system. While the proximate mechanisms underlying this broad targeting have not been fully characterized, two mechanisms used by parasites to alter behavior in vertebrate hosts have been identified: infection of the central nervous system and altered neurochemical communication.

=== Central nervous system infection ===
Some parasites alter host behavior by infecting neurons in the host's central nervous system. The host's central nervous system responds to the parasite as it would to any other infection. The hallmarks of such response include local inflammation and the release of chemicals such as cytokines. The immune response itself is responsible for induced behavioral changes in many cases of parasitic infection. Parasites that are known to induce behavioral changes through central nervous system inflammation in their hosts include Toxoplasma gondii in rats, Trypanosoma cruzi in mice and Plasmodium mexicanum in the Mexican lizard.

=== Immune response ===
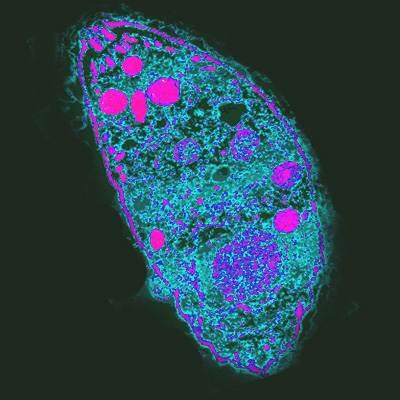
Toxoplasma gondii induces behavioral changes in rats by infecting central nervous system neurons.

While some parasites exploit their hosts' typical immune responses, others seem to alter the immune response itself. For example, the typical immune response in rodents is characterized by heightened anxiety. Infection with Toxoplasma gondii inhibits this response, increasing the risk of predation by T. gondii's subsequent hosts. The inhibited anxiety-response could be the result of immunological damage to the limbic system.

=== Altered neurotransmission ===
Parasites that induce behavioral changes in their hosts often exploit the regulation of social behavior in the brain. Social behavior is regulated by neurotransmitters, such as dopamine and serotonin, in the emotional centers of the brain – primarily the amygdala and the hypothalamus, and although parasites may be capable of stimulating specific neurochemical pathways to induce behavioral changes, evidence suggests that they alter neurochemical communication through broad rather than specific targeting. For example, Toxoplasma gondii attaches to the hypothalamus rather than target a specific cellular pathway; this broad targeting leads to a widespread increase in host dopamine levels, which may in turn account for the loss of aversion to cat odor. In some cases, T. gondii is believed to cause increases in dopamine levels by secreting another compound, L-DOPA, which may trigger a rise in dopamine levels, though concrete evidence for this mechanism has not yet been demonstrated. This rise in dopamine levels induces a loss of aversion to cat odor in the rats, increasing the risk of predation by cats, T. gondii's definitive host. The mechanism of the increase in dopamine levels and the way it changes the rat's behavior remain unknown.

The emerald cockroach wasp alters behavior through the injection of venom directly into the host's brain, causing hypokinesia. This is achieved by a reduction in dopamine and octopamine activity, which affects the transmission of interneurons involved in the escape response; while the host's brain circuitry responsible for movement control is still functional – and indeed it will slog along when pulled by the wasp – the nervous system is in a depressed state. Put differently: the wasp's toxin affects not the host's ability to move, but its motivation to do so.

The original function of such secretions may have been to suppress the immune system of the host, as described above. The trematode Schistosoma mansoni secretes opioid peptides into the host's bloodstream, influencing both its immune response and neural function. Other sources suggest a possible origin in molecular mimicry.

=== Other mechanisms ===
Mermithid nematodes infect arthropods, residing in their haemocoel (circulatory cavity) and manipulating their hemolymph osmolality to trigger water-seeking behavior. The means by which they do so are unknown.

== Evolution ==
=== Addition of intermediate hosts ===
For complex life cycles to emerge in parasites, the addition of an intermediate host species must be beneficial, i.e. result in a higher fitness. It is probable that most parasites with complex life cycles evolved from simple life cycles; the evolution from simple to complex life cycles has been analyzed theoretically, and it has been shown that trophically transmitted parasites (parasites that transmit from a prey host to a predator host during predation) can be favored by the addition of an intermediate prey host if the population density of the intermediate host is higher than that of the definitive host. Additional factors that catalyze this transfer are high predation rates, and a low natural mortality rate of the intermediate host.

Parasites with a single host species are faced with the problem of not being able to survive in higher trophic levels and therefore dying with their prey host. The development of complex life cycles is most likely an adaptation of the parasite to survive in the predator. The development of parasite increased trophic transmission is a further adaptation in relation to a complex life cycle, where the parasite increases its transmission to a definitive host by manipulating its intermediate host.

=== Evolution of induced behaviors ===
The adaptive manipulation hypothesis posits that specific behavioral alterations induced in a host can be used by parasites to increase their fitness. Under this hypothesis, induced behaviors are the result of natural selection acting upon the parasite's extended phenotype (in this case its host's behavior). Many behaviors induced by obligate parasites to complete their lifecycles are examples of adaptive manipulation because of their clear relationship to parasite fitness. For example, evidence has shown that infection by the parasitic worm Pomphorhynchus laevis leads to altered drifting behavior in its intermediate host, the amphipod Gammarus pulex; this altered behavior increases its host's predation risk by fish which are P. laevis's definitive hosts. The induced behavioral change in the host thus leads to the parasite's increased success in completing its life cycle. In general, whether a specific behavioral change serves an adaptive purpose for the parasite, the host, or both, depends on the entire "host-parasite system": the life cycle of the pathogen, its virulence and the host's immune response.

Conversely, evolved behaviors of the host may be a result of adaptations to parasitism.

== Taxonomic range ==
Parasites may alter hosts' behaviors in ways that increase their likelihood of transmission (e.g. by the host being ingested by a predator) result in the parasite's release at appropriate sites (e.g. by changes in the host's preferences for habitats) increase parasite survival or the host's likelihood of being infected with more parasites.

=== Viruses ===
Viruses from the family Baculoviridae induce in their hosts changes to both feeding behavior and environment selection. They infect moth and butterfly caterpillars, which, some time following infection, begin to eat incessantly, providing nutrients for the virus's replication. When the virions (individual virus particles) are ready to leave the host, the caterpillar climbs progressively higher until its cells are induced to secrete enzymes that liquefy the body, releasing clumps of tissue and viral material that fall to be ingested by future hosts.

Rabies is a disease caused by viruses of the Lyssavirus genus, which are released into a host's saliva and transmitted when it comes in contact with an other animal's mucous membranes or open wounds. The disease causes the host to become aggressive and prone to attacking or biting others; this, along with increased salivation, increases the chances of it spreading to new hosts. At the same time, the host experiences hydrophobia (fear of water) and laryngeal spasms.

=== Protozoa ===
The malaria parasite Plasmodium falciparum, carried by the Anopheles gambiae mosquito, changes its host's attraction to sources of nectar so as to increase its sugar intake and enhance the parasite's chance of survival. It decreases the host's attraction to human blood while gestating, only to increase it when it is ready to be transmitted to a human host.

The protozoan Toxoplasma gondii infects animals from the family Felidae (its definitive host), and its oocysts are shed with the host's feces. When a rodent consumes the fecal matter it gets infected with the parasite (becoming its intermediate host). The rodent subsequently becomes more extroverted and less fearful of cats, increasing its chance of predation and the parasite's chance of completing its lifecycle. There is some evidence that T. gondii, when infecting humans, alters their behavior in similar ways to rodents; it has also been linked to cases of schizophrenia.

=== Fungi ===
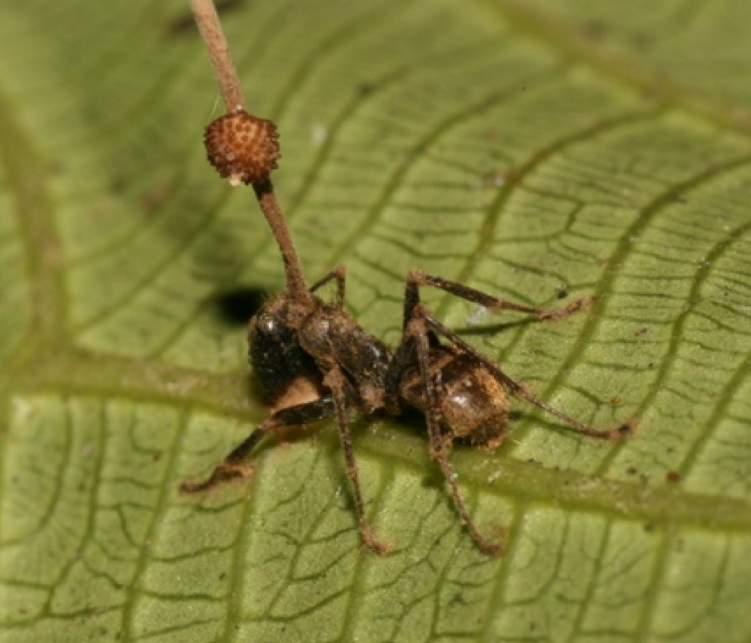
Ant infected by the fungus Ophiocordyceps unilateralis. Its jaws are clamped on to a leaf vein; the fungus's fruiting body has grown from its head.

Ants infected with the fungus Ophiocordyceps unilateralis exhibit intricate behaviors: irregularly timed body convulsions cause the ant to drop to the forest floor, from which it climbs a plant up to a certain height before locking its jaws into the vein of one of its leaves answering certain criteria of direction, temperature, and humidity. After several days the fruiting body of the fungus grows from the ant's head and ruptures, releasing the fungus's spores.

=== Helminths ===
Multiple parasites increase their host's risk of predation to facilitate their transition from their intermediate host to their definitive host, including: Euhaplorchis californiensis, Dicrocoelium dendriticum, Diplostomum pseudospathaceum, and Myrmeconema neotropicum.

The lancet liver fluke (Dicrocoelium dendriticum) is a parasitic trematode with a complex life cycle. In its adult state it occurs in the liver of its definitive host (ruminants), where it reproduces. The parasite eggs are passed with the feces of the host, which then are eaten by a terrestrial snail (first intermediate host). The fluke matures into a juvenile stage in the snail, which in an attempt to protect itself excretes the parasites in "slime-balls". The "slime-balls" are then consumed by ants (second intermediate hosts). The fluke manipulates the ant to move up to the top of grass, where they have a higher chance of being eaten by grazing ruminants.

The trematode Leucochloridium paradoxum matures inside snails of the genus Succinea. When ready to switch to its definitive host, a bird, the parasite travels to the eye stalks of its host and begins to pulsate, attracting birds with its striking resemblance to an insect larva. It also influences the normally nocturnal snail to climb out into the open during the day for an increased chance of being consumed by a bird.

Trematodes of the genus Microphallus parasitise the snail Potamopyrgus antipodarum as an intermediate host. The parasites manipulate the snail's foraging behavior to increase the chance of it being preyed upon by the parasite's definitive hosts (waterfowl). The infected snail forages on the upper side of rocks during the period of the day when waterfowl feed most intensely. During the rest of the day, the snail forages at the bottom of rocks to reduce the risk of being eaten by fish (non-host predators).

Crickets infected by horsehair worms (Nematomorpha) exhibit light-seeking behavior and increased walking speed, leading them to open spaces and ponds (the surface of which reflects moonlight); the crickets eventually find and enter a body of water, where the worm wriggles out of the cricket's abdomen and swims away. While crickets often drown in the process, the survivors partially recover and return to normal activities in as little as 20 hours.

Schistocephalus solidus is a parasitic flatworm with three hosts: two intermediate and one definitive. The adult stage resides in the intestine of piscivorous birds, where they reproduce and release eggs through the bird's feces. Free-swimming larvae hatch from the eggs, which are in turn ingested by copepods (the first intermediate host). The parasite grows and develops in the copepod into a stage that can infect the second intermediate host, the three-spined stickleback. The parasite's definitive host, a bird, then consumes the infected three-spined stickleback and the cycle is complete. S. solidus alters the behavior of the fish in a way that impedes its escape when faced with a predatory bird. The parasite does not induce this behavior until it has reached a developed stage that can survive in the host bird.

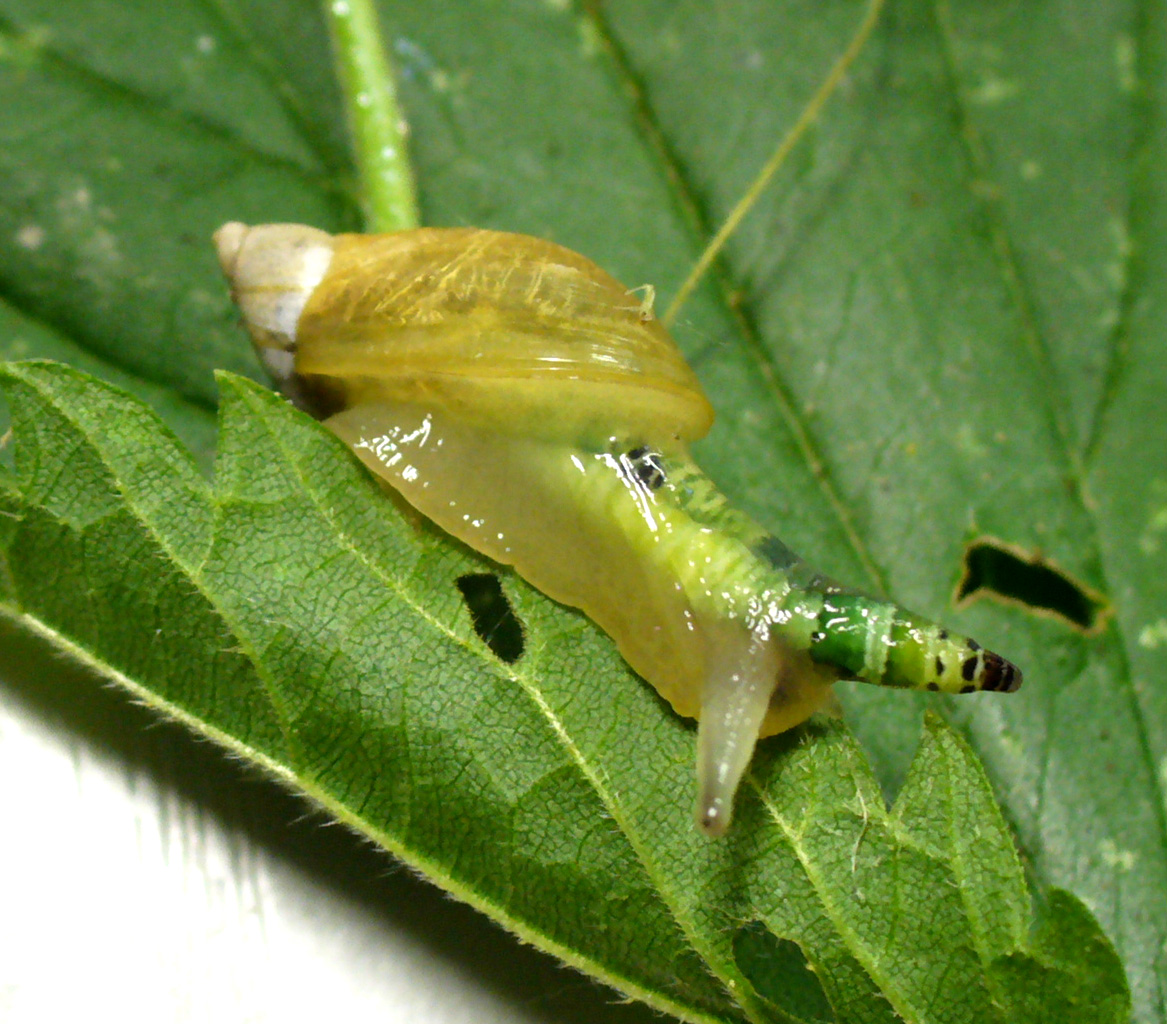
Snail with its left eye stalk parasitized by Leucochloridium paradoxum

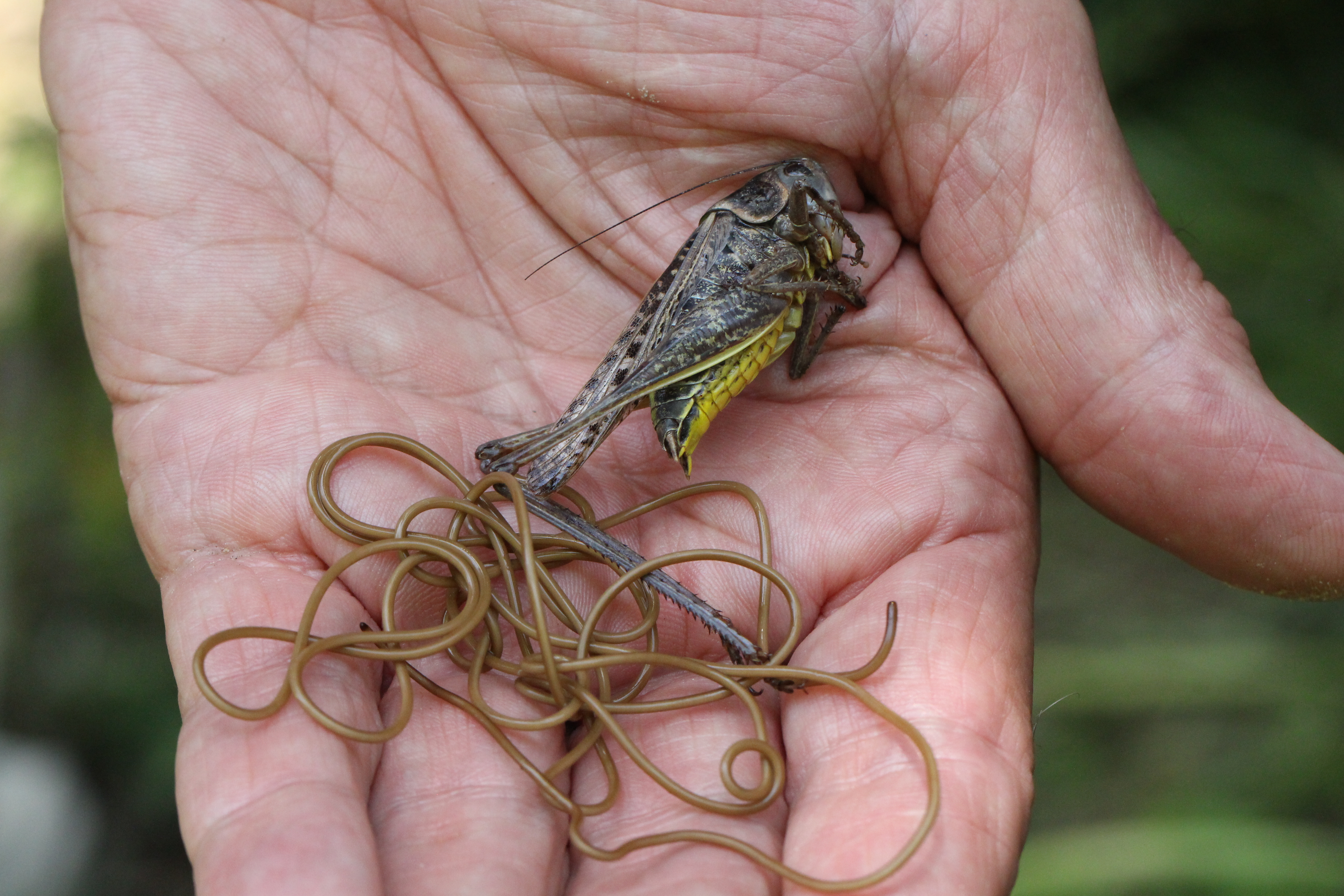
A long horsehair worm shortly after emerging from its cricket host, now drowned

=== Insects ===
Like many parasitoid wasp species, the emerald cockroach wasp (Ampulex compressa) parasitises its host, the American cockroach (Periplaneta americana) as a food source and for its growing larvae. The wasp stings the cockroach twice: first in the thoracic ganglion, paralyzing its front legs and enabling the wasp to deliver a second, more precise sting, directly into the cockroach's brain; this second sting makes the cockroach groom itself excessively before sinking into a state of hypokinesia – "a... lethargy characterized by lack of spontaneous movement or response to external stimuli". The wasp then pulls the idle cockroach into its burrow, where it deposits an egg onto its abdomen and buries it for the growing larva to feed on. Keeping the cockroach in a hypokinetic state at this stage, rather than simply killing it, allows it to stay "fresh" for longer for the larva to feed on. The adult wasp emerges after 6 weeks, leaving behind nothing but an empty cockroach "shell".

The wasp Dinocampus coccinellae is both an endoparasite and ectoparasite of ladybugs. The wasp injects an egg into the beetle's abdomen, where the larva feeds on its haemolymph. When grown and ready to pupate the larva exits its host, which remains immobile, and weaves a cocoon on its underside, where it pupates. When a predator approaches, the beetle twitches its limbs, scaring the predator off. This use of the host as a protection has been termed bodyguard manipulation. Similarly, several parasitic wasps induce their spider hosts to build stronger webs to protect the growing parasites.

The parasitic wasp Hymenoepimecis argyraphaga grows its larvae on spiders of the species Leucauge argyra. Shortly before killing its host the larva injects it with a chemical that changes its weaving behavior, causing it to weave a strong, cocoon-like structure. The larva then kills the spider and enters the cocoon to pupate.

The larvae of the parasitic wasp Reclinervellus nielseni attach to the spider Cyclosa argenteoalba, releasing substances that modify the spider's web-building behavior so that it weaves a cocoon-like structure for the larvae to pupate in. This manipulated behavior was longer lasting and more prominent the longer the larvae were attached to the spider.

Several species of fly in the genus Pseudacteon parasitize fire ants. The fly injects an egg into the ant's thorax; upon hatching, the larva migrates into the ant's head, where it feeds on the ant's haemolymph, muscle and nerve tissue. During this period some larvae direct the ant up to 50 meters away from the nest and toward a moist, leafy place where they can hatch safely. Eventually the larva completely devours the ant's brain, which often falls off (hence the species nickname: "decapitating fly"). The larva then pupates in the empty head capsule, emerging as an adult fly after two weeks.

Strepsiptera of the family Myrmecolacidae can cause their ant host to linger on the tips of grass leaves, increasing the chance of being found by the parasite's males (in case of females) and putting them in a good position for male emergence (in case of males).

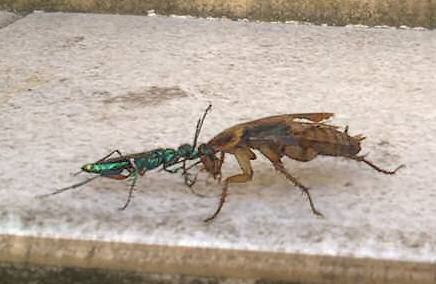
Emerald cockroach wasp "walking" a paralyzed cockroach to its burrow

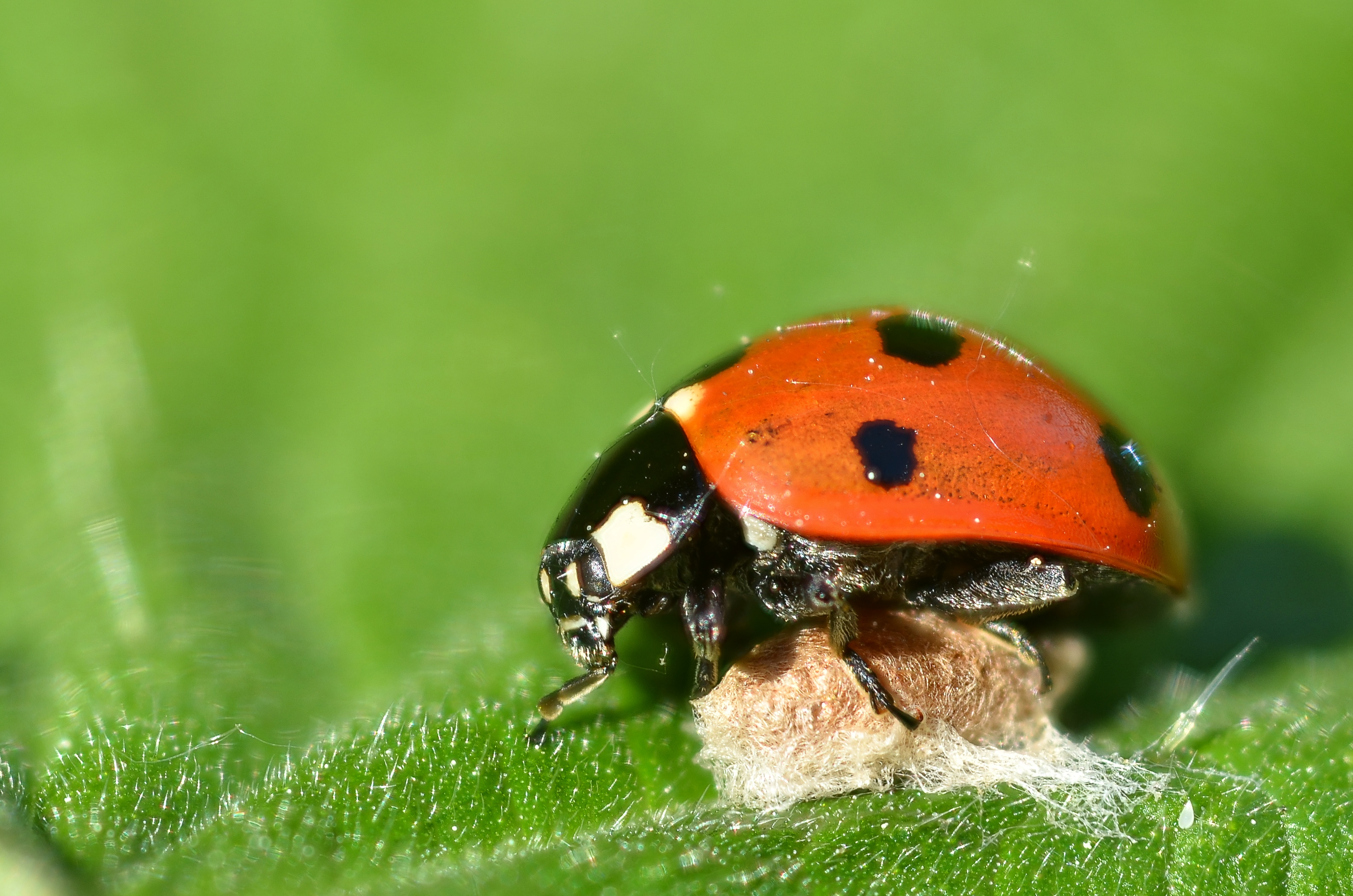
Ladybug guarding a Dinocampus coccinellae cocoon

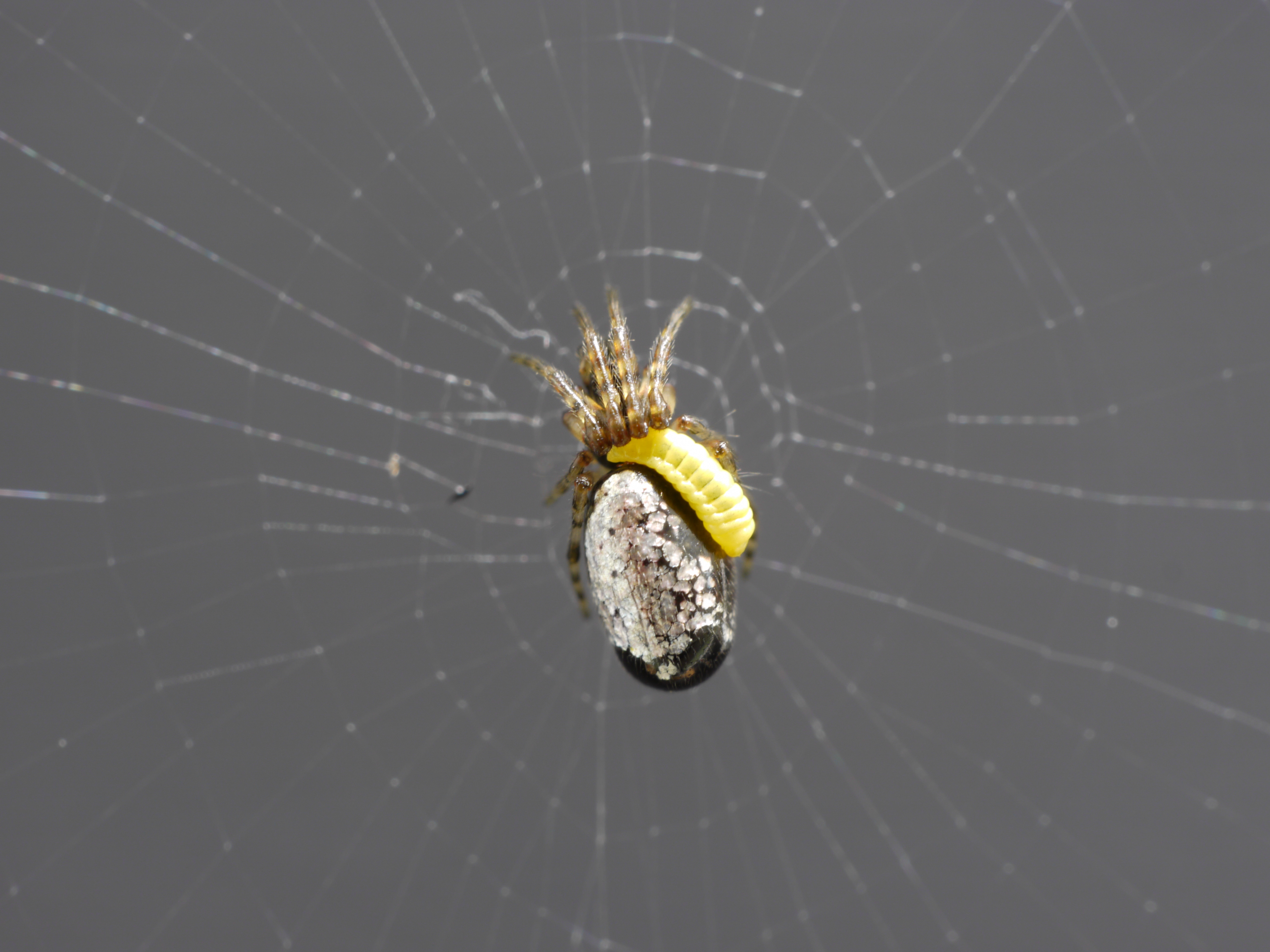
A Reclinervellus nielseni wasp larva parasitizing a Cyclosa argenteoalba spider

=== Crustaceans ===
Members of the order Rhizocephala such as Sacculina carcini alter male hosts' hormonal balance, to encourage nurturing behavior similar to that seen in females. The parasite usually spends its entire life within the host.

== See also ==
- Gall
