= Neuroparasitology =

Field of study

Neuroparasitology is an interdisciplinary field of biology at the intersection of neuroscience and parasitology. This field encompasses the study of parasites that infect, interact with, or otherwise affect the nervous system of their hosts, resulting in changes to brain structure, function, and/or behavior. It integrates approaches from neuroscience, parasitology, immunology, and behavioral biology to study both pathological outcomes, such as neuroinflammation and neurological disease, and coevolutionary relationships between behavior-manipulating parasites and their hosts.

From an evolutionary perspective, parasite-induced behavioral manipulation can increase parasite fitness by enhancing their odds of survival, reproductive capacity, and/or success of transmission to the new hosts. These strategies are favored by natural selection when altered host behavior increases the likelihood that parasite genes are passed on, even if the modification is detrimental to the host. This "gene's-eye view" of evolution was proposed by Richard Dawkins in his book The Selfish Gene, arguing that natural selection acts primarily on genes and favors traits that enhance their own replication. He later expanded on this idea in his book The Extended Phenotype, introducing the concept that the effects of genes are not limited to an organism's physical body but can extend into the environment and, importantly in the case of behavior-manipulating parasites, to other organisms. Within this framework, parasite-induced extended phenotypes increase the parasite's evolutionary fitness.

== Scope ==
The field of neuroparasitology is inherently interdisciplinary, encompassing research approaches from the following areas of biology:

- Coevolution: how the emergence of extended phenotypes in parasites and immune responses or social behaviors in the host shape their shared evolutionary trajectories.
- Parasitology: how these parasites enter, persist within, and damage nervous tissue of their host, leading to neurological effects such as inflammation, tissue disruption, and impairment.
- Behavior Manipulation: changes in host behavior associated with infection that benefit the parasite and how these differ from other sickness behaviors.
- Neurobiology: parasite- and host-derived factors (e.g., secondary metabolites, immune mediators, effector molecules) that may influence neural circuits, neurotransmission, and endocrine pathways.
- Molecular biology: identification and characterization of the biomolecules involved in alteration of the nervous system.
- Genetics: exploration of the host and parasite genomes.

== Association with "zombies" ==
Within the neuroparasitology literature, particularly in the case of behavior manipulation, the hosts and/or their behavior-manipulating parasites are often referred to as "zombies" or "zombie-making" entities, borrowing from popular zombie horror films.

== Animal models and host manipulation ==
There are several animal–parasite pairings that are used as model systems to study behavior manipulation in the field of neuroparasitology, largely due to their conspicuous and reproducible extended phenotypes. For fungal entomopathogens, model hosts include flies, beetles, and ants infected by parasitic Entomophthorale or Ophiocordycipitaceae fungi. These fungi collectively manipulate their hosts' behavior, driving them to higher locations for easier dispersal of infectious spores using the wind. Another classic system is the zombie cockroach, produced by the emerald jewel wasp Ampulex compressa, which injects venom directly into the cockroach brain to suppress escape behavior while leaving motor abilities largely intact. Among vertebrates, infection with Toxoplasma gondii is widely studied for its association with altered fear responses and risk-taking behavior. In humans, sleeping sickness caused by Trypanosoma brucei serves as an important neuroparasitology model due to its effect on the central nervous system and associated disruptions of sleep, cognition, and behavior.

== Relevance to human health ==
Neuroparasitology contributes to the understanding of various human ailments, including headaches, seizures, focal neurological deficits, cognitive impairment, or other changes associated with central nervous system. Studying parasite-induced behavioral manipulation can provide insight into how neural function and behavior are related by identifying how specific molecules, neural circuits, and immune responses influence behavior. From an applied perspective, research on behavioral manipulation has informed the development of novel biocontrol strategies, including the use of parasites (or parasite-derived compounds) to alter the behavior of agricultural pests or disease vectors. Because such approaches can target behavior rather than causing rapid mortality, they may reduce selection for resistance relative to some conventional chemical pesticides and furthermore protect non-targeted species. Together, these models connect basic research in neuroscience and parasitology with efforts to develop more sustainable methods for controlling pests and vectors that affect human health.

== See also ==
- Behavior-altering parasite
