= Diplostomum pseudospathaceum =

Scientific classification
- Kingdom: Animalia
- Phylum: Platyhelminthes
- Class: Trematoda
- Order: Diplostomida
- Family: Diplostomidae
- Genus: Diplostomum
- Species: D. pseudospathaceum

Binomial name
- Diplostomum pseudospathaceum Niewiadomska, 1984

Species of fluke

Diplostomum pseudospathaceum is a species of trematode in the family Diplostomidae.

== Life cycle ==
It is a type of fluke infecting the eyes of some species of fish, altering their movement patterns to suit its needs at different stages of development. The parasite infects snails and birds, sexually reproducing in the latter (its primary host) and asexually in the former (its first intermediate host), as well as many species of fish (its second intermediate host). When infecting a fish, it quickly moves into the fish's eye lenses, as they lack blood circulation, so the parasite is protected there from the host's immune system. This latter trait is probably responsible for the parasite's broad range of fish host species. Having infected the fish, the course of infection can be modulated by co-infection with Flavobacterium columnare.

== Hosts ==
Intermediate hosts of Diplostomum pseudospathaceum include:

- Lymnaea stagnalis (great pond snail)
- Oncorhynchus mykiss (rainbow trout)
- Oreoleuciscus potanini
- Radix labiata

It is known to infect Larus ridibundus, the black-headed gull, as a definitive host.
