= Alaria americana =

Scientific classification
- Domain: Eukaryota
- Kingdom: Animalia
- Phylum: Platyhelminthes
- Class: Trematoda
- Order: Diplostomida
- Family: Diplostomidae
- Genus: Alaria
- Species: A. americana

Binomial name
- Alaria americana Hall & Wigdor, 1918

Synonyms
- Alaria canis

Species of fluke

Alaria americana is a species of trematode in the family Diplostomidae. All Diplostomidae species infect carnivorous mammals by living in their small intestines as mature worms. A. americana is most frequently found in temperate regions, predominantly in northern North America. Its habit is extremely diverse, as the species occupies four different hosts throughout its lifetime. It thrives in areas close to water as water is needed for several developmental stages to occur. It has been isolated to a wide range of North American mammals as definitive hosts, including cattle, lynx, martens, skunks, bobcats, foxes, coyotes, and wolves.

== Description ==
Alaria americana is very small, a fluke no bigger than 6mm in length and 2mm in width. The anterior portion is flat; the posterior half has a cylindrical shape. It has two small suckers about 100 um wide to aid in absorption and digestion of nutrients. As is common with other flukes, there are no external signs of segmentation. The mouth ends in the pharynx that allows for sucking. The digestive tract is blind, meaning it has no rectum, and is not linear, as in most animals, but branched, ending in several blind ducts.

== Reproduction ==
The species is monoecious, meaning the individual has both male and female reproductive organs, consisting of a single ovary and testes. It reproduces in the definitive host and then passes unembryonated eggs in the feces. It is oviparous - a key reproductive feature: the female releases the eggs and the development of offspring occurs outside the mother's body. There is no parental investment from the trematode beyond the release of its eggs.

== Habitat ==
Habitats include tropical as well as temperate regions, in both terrestrial and freshwater locations. Terrestrial biomes include forests, rainforests, and mountains. Aquatic biomes include lakes, ponds, rivers, streams and temporary pools. Wetlands include marshes and swamps. Other habitat features include urban areas, suburbs and agricultural areas.

== Life cycle ==
Alaria americana is a three-host trematode that lives as adults in the intestine of the dog as typical definitive host. Eggs are passed in feces and hatch in water, releasing miracidia which penetrate the helisomid freshwater snails (first intermediate host) and develop through the sporocyst stage into cercariae. Cercariae released from snails actively penetrate the second intermediate host (tadpoles) becoming infective mesocercariae in about two weeks. In the tadpole or in the frogs (following the metamorphosis), mesocercariae accumulate and may be ingested by a number of paratenic hosts (e.g. other frogs, snakes) or directly by the definitive host.

== Human infections ==
Alaria americana is not infectious to humans through normal routes (skin contact, or ingestion of feces of, for instance, infected household pets). Cases of human intraocular infection with mesocercariae of this and other Alaria species have been recorded in patients who had ingested undercooked contaminated frog legs. Both patients presented with pigmentary tracks in the retina, areas of active or healed retinitis and signs of diffuse unilateral subacute neuroretinitis. There has been a report of a fatal infection with Alaria americana in a hiker.

== Animal infections ==
It is not common for A. americana to infect common household animals, but infection of dogs or cats can occur and may go unnoticed since it is harmless and asymptomatic to these animals. It can be acquired by drinking contaminated water infested with eggs that have released miracidia larvae, which are highly motile.
