= Diplostomum baeri =

Scientific classification
- Kingdom: Animalia
- Phylum: Platyhelminthes
- Class: Trematoda
- Order: Diplostomida
- Family: Diplostomidae
- Genus: Diplostomum
- Species: D. baeri

Binomial name
- Diplostomum baeri Dubois, 1937

Synonyms
- Diplostomulum baeri (Dubois, 1937) ·

Species of flatworm

Diplostomum baeri is a species of flatworm belonging to the family Diplostomidae.

Subspecies

- Diplostomum baeri bucculentum Dubois & Rausch, 1948
- Diplostomum baeri eucaliae Hoffman & Hundley, 1957

It is a type of fluke that infects the eyeballs of some fish and snails.

== Distribution ==
The type locality is contained in Switzerland.

== Hosts ==
- Stagnicola palustris
- Stagnicola palustris elodes
