= Alaria =

Alaria may refer to:

- Alaria (alga), a brown alga genus in the family Alariaceae
- Alaria (flatworm), a trematode genus in the family Diplostomatidae
