= Plasmodium mexicanum =

Scientific classification
- Domain: Eukaryota
- Clade: Sar
- Clade: Alveolata
- Phylum: Apicomplexa
- Class: Aconoidasida
- Order: Haemospororida
- Family: Plasmodiidae
- Genus: Plasmodium
- Species: P. mexicanum

Binomial name
- Plasmodium mexicanum Thompson and Huff, 1944

Species of single-celled organism

Plasmodium mexicanum is a parasite of the genus Plasmodium subgenus Paraplasmodium.

Like all Plasmodium species P. mexicanum has both vertebrate and insect hosts. The vertebrate hosts for this parasite are reptiles.

== Taxonomy ==
The parasite was first described by Thompson and Huff in 1944.

== Distribution ==
This parasite is found in Arizona, United States.

== Hosts ==
This parasite infects the Sceloporus ferraripezi, S. horridus, S. microlepidotus, western fence lizard (S. occidentalis), S. pyrocephalus, S. variabilis, S. torquatus torquatus (subspecies of S. torquatus) and the tree lizard Urosaurus ornatus.

This species is unusual in being able to undergo normal sporogony in psychodid flies – Lutzomyia stewarti and L. vexatrix occidentis, an unrecognized subspecies of L. vexator. Vector competence of L. vexator has also been demonstrated.
