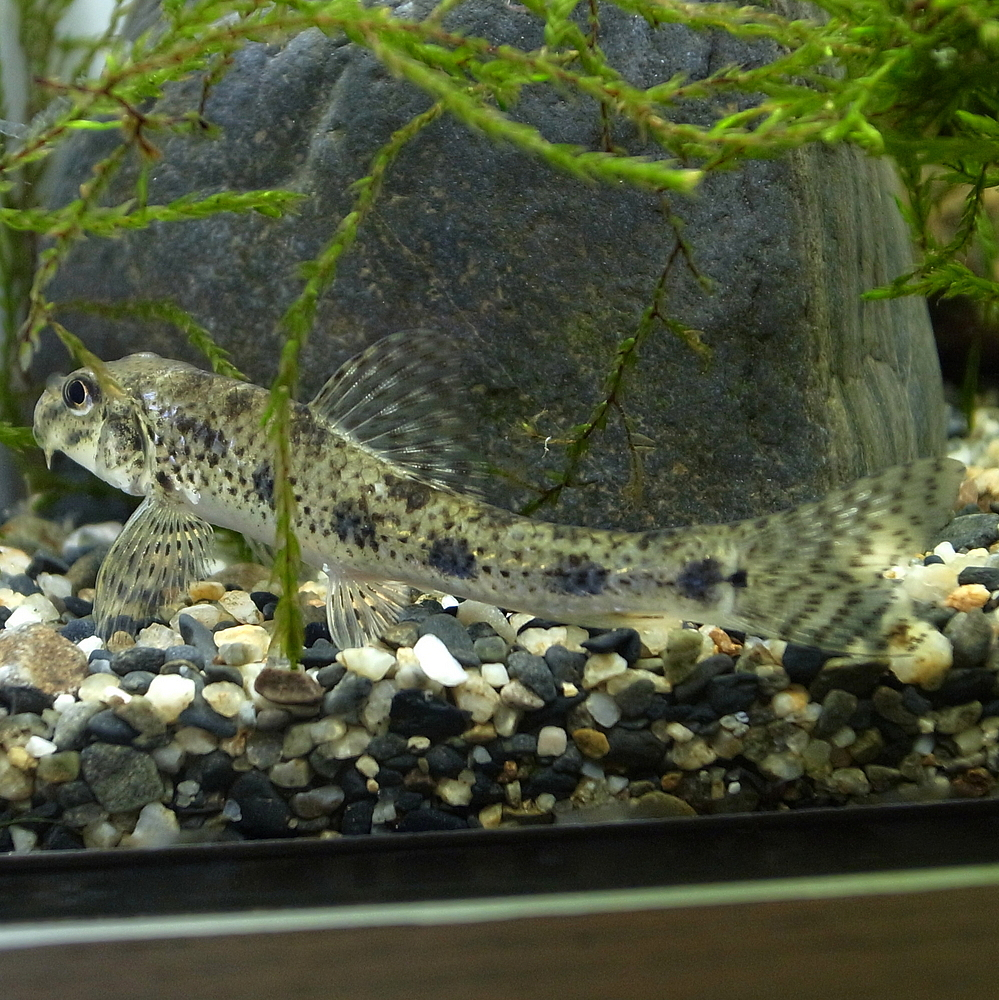

Conservation status
- Least Concern (IUCN 3.1)

Scientific classification
- Kingdom: Animalia
- Phylum: Chordata
- Class: Actinopterygii
- Order: Cypriniformes
- Suborder: Cyprinoidei
- Family: Gobionidae
- Genus: Abbottina
- Species: A. rivularis

Binomial name
- Abbottina rivularis (Basilewsky, 1855)

Synonyms
- Gobio rivularis Basilewsky, 1855; Pseudogobio rivularis (Basilewsky, 1855); Tylognathus sinensis Kner, 1867; Abbottina psegma Jordan & Fowler, 1903

= Abbottina rivularis =

Species of fish

Abbottina rivularis, also known as the Chinese false gudgeon or the Amur false gudgeon, is a species of ray-finned fish in the family Gobionidae, the gudgeons. It is native to China, Korea, and Japan, but it has been introduced to the Mekong River Basin and is also known from rivers in Turkmenistan.

== Description ==
A. rivularis has eight dark spots along its lateral line and many black dots on its caudal fin.When maturity is reached, this species' total length is about 4 to 5 centimetres (1.6 to 2.0 in), however the maximum recorded length for A. rivularis was recorded to be 18.9 centimetres (7.4 in).

== Distribution and habitat ==
A. rivularis lives in rivers and lakes, and it is often found in converted lowland aquatic habitat, such as irrigation ditches and ponds associated with rice paddies. In the slow moving, lentic rivers and lakes that it inhabits, it prefers sandy or muddy bottoms. Native to China and Japan, this species has been introduced into the Mekong river basin, and has also been recorded Tedzhen River of Turkmenistan.

== Biology ==
A. rivularis is host to a number of recorded parasites, including the monogenean flatworms Gyrodactylus rivularae and G. gobioninum, several trematode flatworms of the genus Diplostomum, and the tapeworm Khawia abbottinae. An egg laying species A. rivularis, reproduces by laying eggs into a nest. Males construct the nest, which ranges from 12 to 43 centimetres (17 in) in diameter, at a depth from 8 to 34 centimetres (13 in). The male also broods over the spawn, which might consist of 1,700 eggs or more.
