= Euhaplorchis =

Scientific classification
- Kingdom: Animalia
- Phylum: Platyhelminthes
- Class: Trematoda
- Order: Plagiorchiida
- Family: Heterophyidae
- Genus: Euhaplorchis
- Species: E. californiensis

Binomial name
- Euhaplorchis californiensis Martin, 1950

Species of fluke

Euhaplorchis californiensis is a parasite that lives in the salt-water marshes of Southern California, United States, transmitted trophically (as a TTP by being eaten by hosts). It lives in three hosts: shorebirds, horn snails, and killifish. As with many TTPs, E. californiensis modifies the behavior of the host to increase the likelihood of transmission to its next host.

== Life cycle ==
The parasite's eggs are released in the droppings of shorebirds. Horn snails consume the droppings and become sterile. Once the parasite has lived in the snail a couple of generations, the cercariae (the disk-shaped larvae of flukes of the class Trematoda, which have a tail-like appendage) swim out into the marsh.

The cercariae latch onto the gills of the killifish and make their way along a nerve and into the brain cavity, where, as metacercariae, they encyst in the meningeal layer on the brain surface. The parasites form a “carpet-like” layer over the brain. According to Kevin D. Lafferty, infected killifish are four times more likely to “shimmy, jerk, flash, and surface” than uninfected fish. This behavior makes the infected fish 10 to 30 times more likely to be caught and consumed by a bird. Once the fish is consumed, the parasite lives in the bird's gut and produces eggs to be released in the stool, which is spread into the marshes and ponds. Therefore, starting the cycle again.

== Effects on the ecosystem ==
Armand Kuris speculates that the predator in this host-parasite interaction benefits by acquiring food easily. He also claims that the susceptibility of infected killifish to be picked up by their avian predators has led to a diverse and abundant assemblage of piscivorous birds along the coasts.

Lafferty did a study to observe how a population of un-parasitized snails performs in the absence of infected snails. He found that they released more eggs and became densely populated. He proposes that the snail population in the natural environment would be nearly double what it is if it weren't for the parasite Euhaplorchis californiensis.
