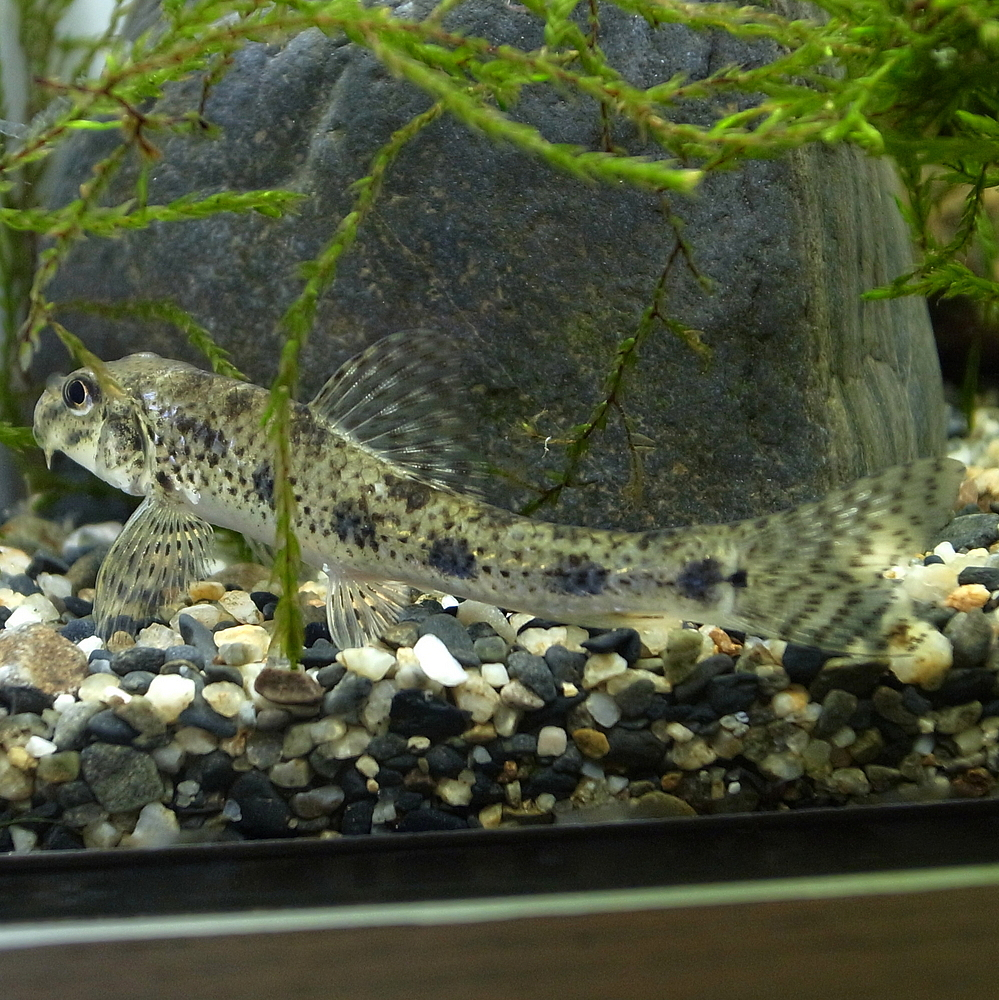
- Abbottina rivularis

Scientific classification
- Kingdom: Animalia
- Phylum: Chordata
- Class: Actinopterygii
- Order: Cypriniformes
- Family: Gobionidae
- Genus: Abbottina; D. S. Jordan & Fowler, 1903

Type species
- Abbottina rivularis Jordan & Fowler, 1903

= Abbottina =

Genus of fishes

Abbottina is a genus of ray-finned fish belonging to the family Gobionidae, the gudgeons. The fishes in this genus occur in eastern Asia (China, Korea, Japan, and Vietnam). The genus was named for the American zoologist James Fisher Abbott, student at Stanford University and later professor of English at Naval Academy Etajima and of zoology at Washington University in St. Louis.

== Species ==
These are the currently recognized species in this genus:

- Abbottina binhi Nguyễn, 2001
- Abbottina lalinensis Z.-H. Huang & Z.-P. Li, 1995
- Abbottina rivularis (Basilewsky, 1855) - Chinese false gudgeon
