= Neodiplostomum =

Scientific classification
- Kingdom: Animalia
- Phylum: Platyhelminthes
- Class: Trematoda
- Order: Diplostomida
- Family: Diplostomidae
- Genus: Neodiplostomum; Railliet, 1919

Genus of worms

Neodiplostomum is a genus of flatworms belonging to the family Diplostomidae.

The genus has almost cosmopolitan distribution.

Species:

- Neodiplostomum aluconis Tubangui, 1933
- Neodiplostomum americanum
- Neodiplostomum attenuatum (von Linstow, 1906)
- Neodiplostomum auritum (Dujardin, 1845)
- Neodiplostomum canaliculatum (Nicoll, 1914)
- Neodiplostomum conicum Dubois, 1937
- Neodiplostomum ellipticum (Brandes, 1888) LaRue, 1926
- Neodiplostomum elongatum Soota & Srivastava, 1969
- Neodiplostomum haliaetum Yang, 1965
- Neodiplostomum intermedium
- Neodiplostomum major Dubinina, 1950
- Neodiplostomum microcotyle Dubois, 1937
- Neodiplostomum morchelloides Semenov, 1927
- Neodiplostomum obscurum Dubois, 1937
- Neodiplostomum oriolinum Oshmarin, 1963
- Neodiplostomum seoulense (Seo, Rim, and Lee, 1964) Hong and Shoop, 1994
- Neodiplostomum spathoides Dubois, 1937
- Neodiplostomum spathula (Creplin, 1829) La Rue, 1926
- Neodiplostomum spathulaeforme (Brandes, 1888) Railliet, 1919
- Neodiplostomum toruligenitale
- Neodiplostomum travassosi Dubois, 1937
