= Tylodelphys =

Scientific classification
- Kingdom: Animalia
- Phylum: Platyhelminthes
- Class: Trematoda
- Order: Diplostomida
- Family: Diplostomidae
- Genus: Tylodelphys; Diesing, 1850

Genus of flukes

Tylodelphys is a genus of parasitic fluke that infects the small water fish. It induces many behavioral changes on its host. Once inside a fish's eye, it can cause partial blindness and several behavioral changes to the intermediate host. Other species of flukes are able to turn into dormant cysts at certain stages of development, but Tylodelphys spp. stays active and roams free inside the fish's eye, giving it an opportunity for it to induce parasite behavior. When Tylodelphys larvae crawl around the inside of the fish's eye, it can get in between the retina and the lens. This can cause partial blindness to the fish, rendering the fish unable to notice predators. Tylodelphys consists of two species, Tylodelphys clavata (von Nordmann, 1832) and Tylodelphys podicipina Kozicka & Niewiadomska, 1960.

== Life cycle ==
Tylodelphys spp. has a complex three-host life cycle, with a variety of fish- and amphibian-eating birds and lymnaeid or planorbid gastropods as first intermediate hosts. Tylodelphys must enter the gut of fish-eating bird, which would naturally involve the fish being eaten by the said bird such as ciconiiforms, suliforms, falconiforms and podicipediforms acting as definitive hosts. Tylodelphys species can also infect the brain or the body cavity of their second intermediate hosts, which are typically fish but sometimes amphibians. The common intermediate host, the bully, Tylodelphys dwells in its host's eyes in the vitreous liquid between the lens and the retina.

== Behavior ==
Like many trematode parasites, Tylodelphys plays a huge role in manipulation of behavior. A study was done where the particular behavior of the parasite itself can affect the behavior of the host. Tylodelphys spp. has daily routines, where it shifts it position in the eye, varying through the day. It is during the day where these flukes sit between the lens and the retina, which block the eyesight of the fish. During the night, the flukes settle down to the bottom of the eye, which allows the fish to have a sense of sight. A question that is then posed is why doesn't the parasite just stay in front of the retina all the time. In recent studies, it is shown that not all predators are the same for Tylodelphys. In the day time, the predators of the bullies are fish eating birds, but at night the main predators are longfin eels. It's better for the fluke if the fish can still see and avoid predators at night, so hence the fluke keeps the eyes covered in the day but moves it away at night. Tylodelphys spp. metacercariae may limit the bully's ability to perceive visual cues of predatory threat by obscuring vision during the day, in a similar manner to Diplostomum induced cataracts, favoring completion of the trematode's life cycle. It is also important to note that metacercariae are often considered passive; however, in this life cycle it demonstrated that metacercariae exhibit a complex behavioral phenotype playing a key role in furthering their life history.
