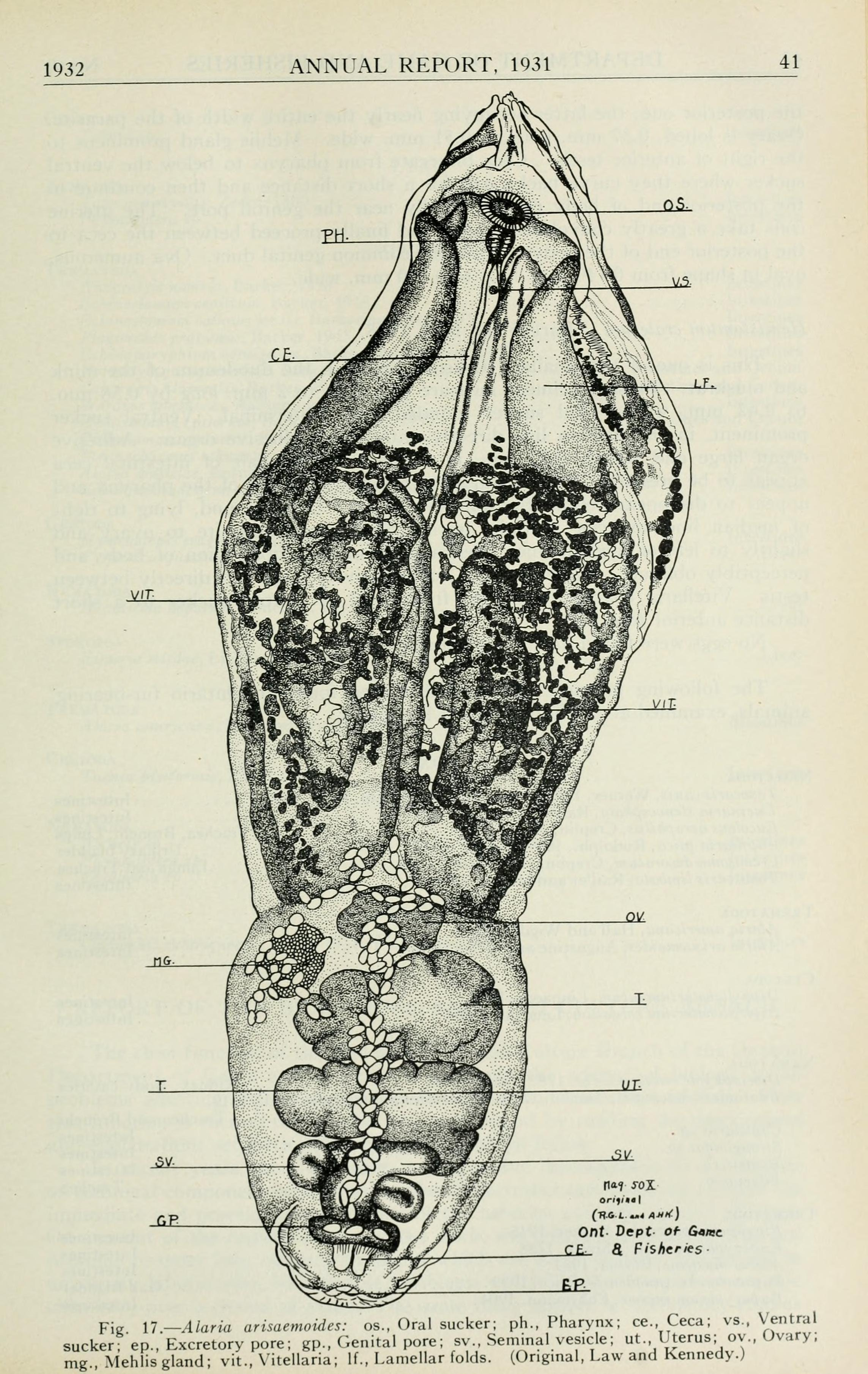
- Alaria arisaemoides

Scientific classification
- Kingdom: Animalia
- Phylum: Platyhelminthes
- Class: Trematoda
- Order: Diplostomida
- Family: Diplostomidae
- Genus: Alaria; Schrank, 1788

Species
- Alaria alata (Goeze, 1792); Alaria americana; Alaria arisaemoides; Alaria intermedia; Alaria mustelae

= Alaria (flatworm) =

Genus of flukes

Alaria is a genus of flatworms, or trematodes, in the family Diplostomidae.

Alaria is a genus of small parasitic worm about 2–6 mm long and approximately 2 mm wide. It is usually found in the small intestine of dogs, cats, or wild carnivores. It is most commonly found in Europe, Asia, and the Americas. The body consists of two shaped parts: the anterior, which is flat, and the posterior, which is conical to cylindrical. Species of Alaria have two suckers, the oral and the ventral. They have only one opening, the mouth. They are hermaphroditic.

== Life cycle ==
Species of Alaria have complex indirect life cycles. There are two intermediate hosts involved, but there can also be paretic hosts, such as snakes, mice, birds, and humans. The eggs, which are oval, operculated, and light brown, are released from adult Alaria and excreted from the final host's faeces and hatched into miracidium that infect the snail host, in which the eggs then give rise to the asexual stage known as sporocysts. The sporocysts then produce cercariae. The cercariae then leave the snail and infect the tadpole via penetration where a non-reproductive form is developed, which is known as mesocercariae. It usually takes about two weeks to develop. The mesocercariae transfer to their tissues and remain at this life-cycle stage. Finally, the parasite reaches its final host once ingested, usually a canid. Other hosts include cats, foxes, and minks.

It has been reported that in the United States, raccoons were also found to act as an intermediate host.

== Infection and pathogenesis ==
After the immature Alaria parasite is ingested it makes its way to the lungs and further develops into adults in the small intestine. Usually, they are not associated with intestinal illness. If the infection levels are high, then it may cause pulmonary damage along with haemorrhage which can lead to clinical disease.

Paratenic hosts also become infected when eating the contaminated intermediate host, either tadpoles or frogs. The mesocercariae remain in organs such as the muscles, connective tissue or lungs, and eyes.

They are mostly harmless in dogs as well as the paratenic hosts. However, prevalence of Alaria in dogs in the United States and foxes in Germany are up to 30%.

Unfortunately for humans, it can be quite harmful and even cause death. Humans can be infected by ingesting Alaria larvae, which can be from eating undercooked frog legs or contaminated boar or pig meat.

== Diagnosis and treatment ==
Infections of Alaria can be diagnosed through faecal examination or thoracic radiographs of dogs and cats. There are no forms of diagnosis in humans. This infection can be treated with praziquantel. It's been noted that another possible treatment is with fenbendazole.

== Control and prevention ==
Alaria infections can be prevented by keeping canines from scavenging or eating infected prey. Preventing predation when feasible. In humans, you can prevent this by not eating undercooked meat of infected hosts.

== Cases of infection ==
There have been cases reported of fatal disease with systematic infection with Alaria larvae ingestion of undercooked frog legs and waterfowl.

One of the first cases reported was a single worm in the eye of a woman from Ontario, Canada. It is believed that she contracted the parasite from rubbing her eyes while preparing frogs legs.
