= Abbottina lalinensis =

Scientific classification
- Kingdom: Animalia
- Phylum: Chordata
- Class: Actinopterygii
- Order: Cypriniformes
- Suborder: Cyprinoidei
- Family: Gobionidae
- Genus: Abbottina
- Species: A. lalinensis

Binomial name
- Abbottina lalinensis Z.-H. Huang & Z.-P. Li, 1995

Species of fish

Abbottina lalinensis is a species of ray-finned fish in the genus Abbottina, a genus within the family Gobionidae, the gudgeons. This fish is found in Heilongjiang and Liaoning, China, in the Songhua River watershed.
