= Reclinervellus =

Scientific classification
- Kingdom: Animalia
- Phylum: Arthropoda
- Class: Insecta
- Order: Hymenoptera
- Family: Ichneumonidae
- Tribe: Ephialtini
- Genus: Reclinervellus; He & Ye, 1998

Genus of insects

Reclinervellus is a genus of parasitoid wasps belonging to the family Ichneumonidae.

The species of this genus parasitise Cyclosa spiders.

Species:

- Reclinervellus dorsiconcavus He & Ye, 1998
- Reclinervellus masumotoi
- Reclinervellus nielseni (Roman, 1923)
