= Diplostomulum =

Scientific classification
- Kingdom: Animalia
- Phylum: Platyhelminthes
- Class: Trematoda
- Order: Diplostomida
- Family: Diplostomidae
- Genus: Diplostomulum; Brandes, 1892

Genus of flatworms

Diplostomulum is a genus of flatworms belonging to the family Diplostomidae.

The species of this genus are found in Northern America.

Species:

- Diplostomulum bufonis Kaw, 1950
- Diplostomulum desmognathi Rankin, 1937
