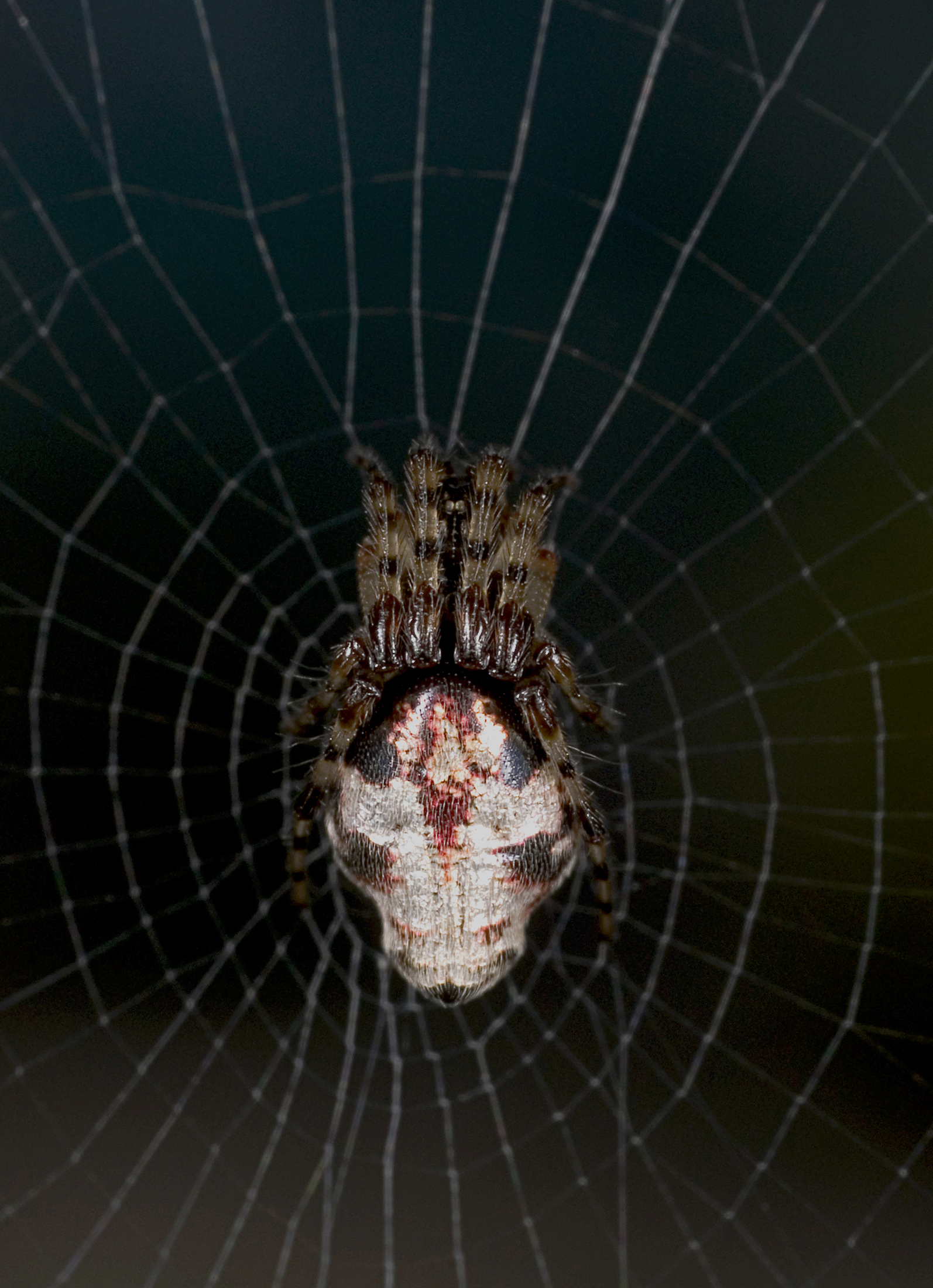

Scientific classification
- Kingdom: Animalia
- Phylum: Arthropoda
- Subphylum: Chelicerata
- Class: Arachnida
- Order: Araneae
- Infraorder: Araneomorphae
- Family: Araneidae
- Genus: Cyclosa
- Species: C. argenteoalba

Binomial name
- Cyclosa argenteoalba Bösenberg & Strand, 1906

= Cyclosa argenteoalba =

Species of spider

Cyclosa argenteoalba is a species of trashline orbweaver in the spider family Araneidae. It is found in East Asia. C. argenteoalba is diurnal, which means it is active during the day. Spiders with less silver coloring are better at catching prey, as the silver is bright and warns their prey of their presence. They catch their prey by waiting in the hub of their web until their prey is close enough to catch. Females are on average 2mm longer in size than males. During mating, female genital mutilation is common in order to increase the fitness of the male. C. argenteoalba often attach silk "decorations" on their webs, which are thought to deter predators. C. argenteoalba frequently relocate to different places to build a new webs until a location with a significant amount of prey is found. Parasitic larvae are often found attached to C. argenteoalba, and the larvae are able to manipulate the spider's behavior.

== Description ==
=== Coloring ===
C. argenteoalba are characterized by black and silver coloring on their dorsal abdomen and a black cephalothorax. They are born with a completely silver dorsal abdomen and change color to include some black as they mature. The silver coloring reflects ultraviolet light, making C. argenteoalba more easily visible if they have a greater percentage of silver. It is most likely due to the presence of guanine in their hypodermis. The amount of black versus silver color varies between individuals. On average, C. argenteoalba is 60% black and 40% silver, but individual coloring can be anywhere between 20% and 100% black. Females possess much more variation than males.

=== Size ===
Female C. argenteoalba are larger than males. The average female length is 5.3mm, and the average male is 3.2mm. This results in a 1.6 ratio of female to male length. In orb-weaving spiders sexual dimorphism is common, with the female being larger. Adult spiders are usually 10mg in weight.

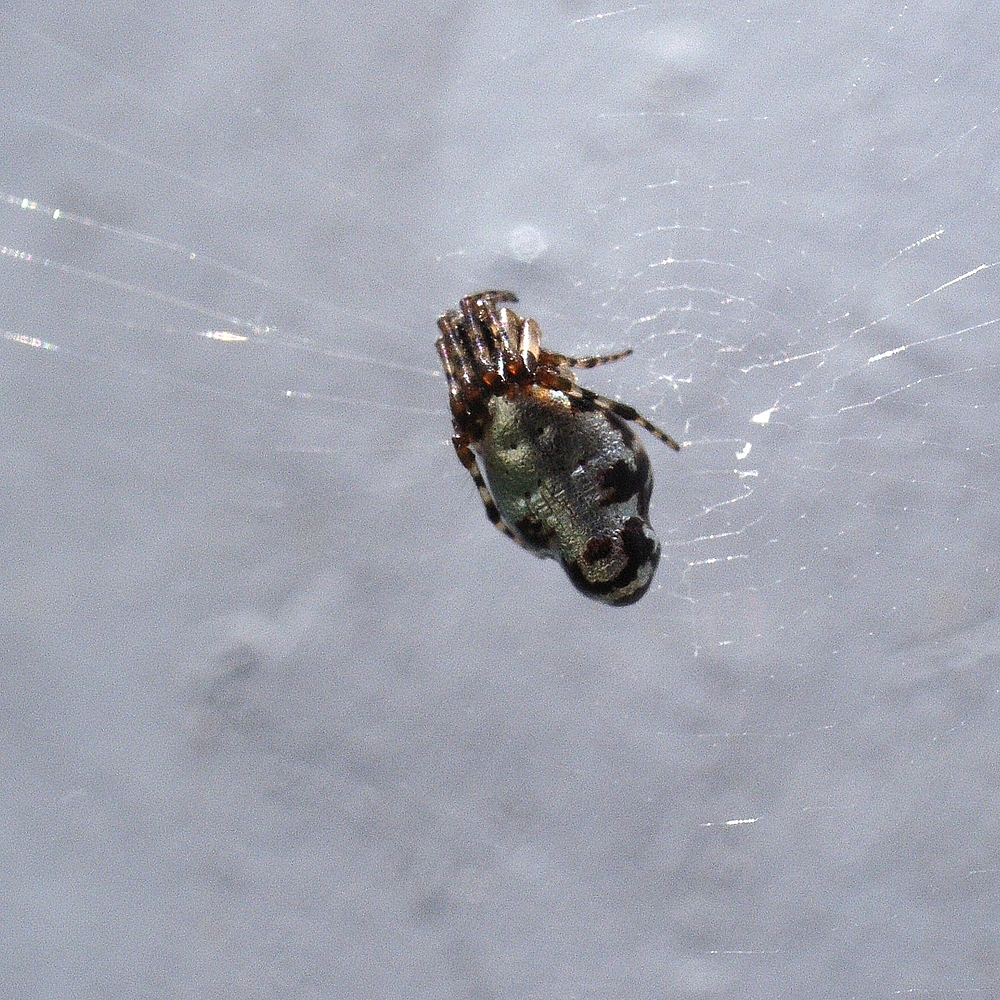
Cyclosa argenteoalba waiting in the hub of its web

== Close relatives ==
Cyclosa octotuberculata is a close relative of the C. argenteoalba, and these two spider species are commonly found in Japan in similar habitats. They also consume similar-sized prey. In addition to geographical location, these two spider species are both diurnal, construct vertical orb webs, and follow the same schedule of daily web building and re-building.

== Distribution and habitat ==
C. argenteoalba is found in China, Korea, Taiwan, Japan, and Russia. They are found in farmland, mountainous regions, and suburban areas, but are usually found on the edge of bamboo and wood forests where there is adequate sunlight.

== Predation and coloring ==
These spiders prey on small flies, such as drosophila. They also eat some small hymenopteran insects, which include bees, wasps, and ants, and hemipteran insects, such as aphids and leafhoppers. C. argenteoalba sit and wait for their prey in the hub of their webs. They often build their webs in open places where they are more likely to catch more prey.

Since C. argenteoalba stay still and wait for their prey, they are better at catching prey if they are not detected. Studies have shown that female spiders that have a higher percentage of silver coloring as opposed to black coloring on their dorsal abdomen are less successful at catching prey. This is due to the high reflectiveness of the silver alerting their prey. However, the silver coloring's disadvantage during hunting has not been completely selected against and has not been eliminated from the population. A suggested hypothesis for why it still exists is that the silver color could help regulate temperature by cooling down the spiders that are exposed to direct sunlight. The female coloring difference is most likely not a factor in mating, since male spiders have poor vision and instead rely on pheromones.

== Webs ==
C. argenteoalba are vertical orbweavers, which means their webs are spiral shaped and are oriented vertically to the ground. On average, their webs are 20cm in diameter. They often build their webs in open locations where they are likely to trap a significant amount of flying prey. This allows them to catch a large amount of insects, but also makes them more visible to potential predators. These spiders use more thread to build their webs when there is more available prey, and less thread when there are more predators. C. argenteoalba's web-building behavior consists of many pre-programmed features that are independent of each other. These features include frame threads, radial threads, sticky spirals, and hub loops. This was shown through experiments with parasites attached to the spiders that manipulated their web-building. The web features that were used were determined by examining when the parasites were removed from the spiders. The spiders also make another kind of web to use only for molting, called "resting webs", which are not sticky and have many silk decorations.

=== Construction ===
C. argenteoalba webs are temporary and may be constructed daily. Webs are usually constructed during the day, and the process frequently begins in the morning and stops in the evening. At night, C. argenteoalba eat the adhesive threads of their web. These spiders always face upwards in their webs, as opposed to other Cyclosa species that may face downwards or sideways. The different orientations of the webs and of the spiders are a means to enhance evasion from predators.

=== Web relocation ===
C. argenteoalba often relocate and rebuild their webs if they determine that a location does not have a significant amount of prey. A unique characteristic of C. argenteoalba is its use of "long-lasting memory" to enhance its foraging efficiency during web relocation. In other words, the rate of web relocation in response to low prey capture is lowered when the spider uses its past foraging experience (i.e. its "long-lasting memory"). Therefore, mature spiders with a more extensive history of foraging will gain a greater benefit upon foraging and a lower cost upon web relocation. They may also relocate due to higher incidences of conspecific interactions in prey abundant areas. But other non-prey related factors for web relocation include environmental factors such as changes in temperature. It takes the spiders a few days to decide if their new location is suitable. C. argenteoalba are more likely to relocate if they have not been in a particular place for very long, as opposed to spiders that are already familiar with the site. The amount of thread spiders use on the second day at a particular place is significantly more than the thread used on the first day, indicating that spiders wait to invest more thread until they decide they are in a good location. When C. argenteoalba abandons old webs, they leave all debris present with the web. Each web they construct has new debris. Their behavior contrasts from their close relative C. octotuberculata, who bring previous debris to their new webs.

=== Decorations ===
These spiders often attach linear silk decorations, referred to as stabilimenta, above or below the web's hub (where the spider waits for their prey). These decorations can come in many forms, including zig-zag bands, linear, cross shapes, disk shapes, or spiral shapes. They will often hang the remains of prey from their web as well. When they relocate and build new webs, they do not transfer any old decorations or debris to the new web. Not all C. argenteoalba webs contain decorations. These decorations do not attract prey like they do in other species of spiders, but instead help protect them from predators. This was determined through experiments where spiders produced longer silk decorations when there was an increased predation risk, but was not affected by the amount of available prey. Web decorations reflect ultraviolet light, which birds and insects that prey on C. argenteoalba are sensitive to. Their predators may not be able to distinguish the decorations from the spider itself and therefore be deceived about the size of the spider.

== Life cycle and reproduction ==
C. argenteoalba usually produce two generations per year, but occasionally will produce three. Typically, they will reproduce in May, August, and sometimes October, and during these times their body mass is at its seasonal peak. After females have laid their eggs, their abdomens are noticeably smaller, which makes their reproduction easier to study. Females avoid laying eggs in their webs, instead opting to lay them in the surrounding area. Spiderlings will emerge from their egg sacs after about a month. Overwintering occurs as they mature, and then they begin building their webs in March. In comparison to other cyclosa species (C. octotuberculata and C. seduculata), C. argenteoalba have a rapid growth rate, a lower survival rate and a larger relative clutch size with smaller eggs. These characteristics lead to a larger investment in reproduction in order to counteract the lower survival rate of the species. C. argenteoalba also show a more prominent reduction in clutch size the second time they lay eggs in a year compared to the first.

== Mating ==
=== Courtship and copulation ===
The courtship ritual of C. argenteoalba begins with the male producing a mating thread, then jerking and poking this thread with its legs. If the female accepts, they copulate while hanging from this mating thread and often rotate around the vertical line. Females have two genital openings. Males have two pedipalps, and they usually use both in succession in order to fill up each of the female's genital openings. They then must repeat their courtship ritual in order to begin filling up the female's second opening.

=== Female genital mutilation ===
Male C. argenteoalba often mutilate female spiders' genitals during mating. They do this by detaching the female's scape, which is their genital appendage that the male must grab to position itself and is necessary for successful mating. Females do not seem to resist mutilation in any way. Male spiders exhibit mutilation behavior in order to control how often the females are able to mate and increase the probability that they will father her offspring, thereby increasing their own fitness. This method of increasing fitness is relatively low-cost to the male, as compared to other means such as guarding the female, blocking females' genital openings with their own appendages, or sexual cannibalism where the male is eaten by the female. C. argenteoalba do not often exhibit female genital mutilation until after males have filled both of the female's genital openings. Even males that had already mated with another female did not often exhibit mutilation behavior towards the second female that only had one palpal insertion. Experiments were also conducted where one of the male's pedipalps was removed, and mutilation was much more common after contralateral insertions than ipsilateral insertions. These results support the two-action hypothesis, which is that each insertion cuts the female's scape halfway on one side and usually requires an insertion on the right and left sides to fully remove the scape.

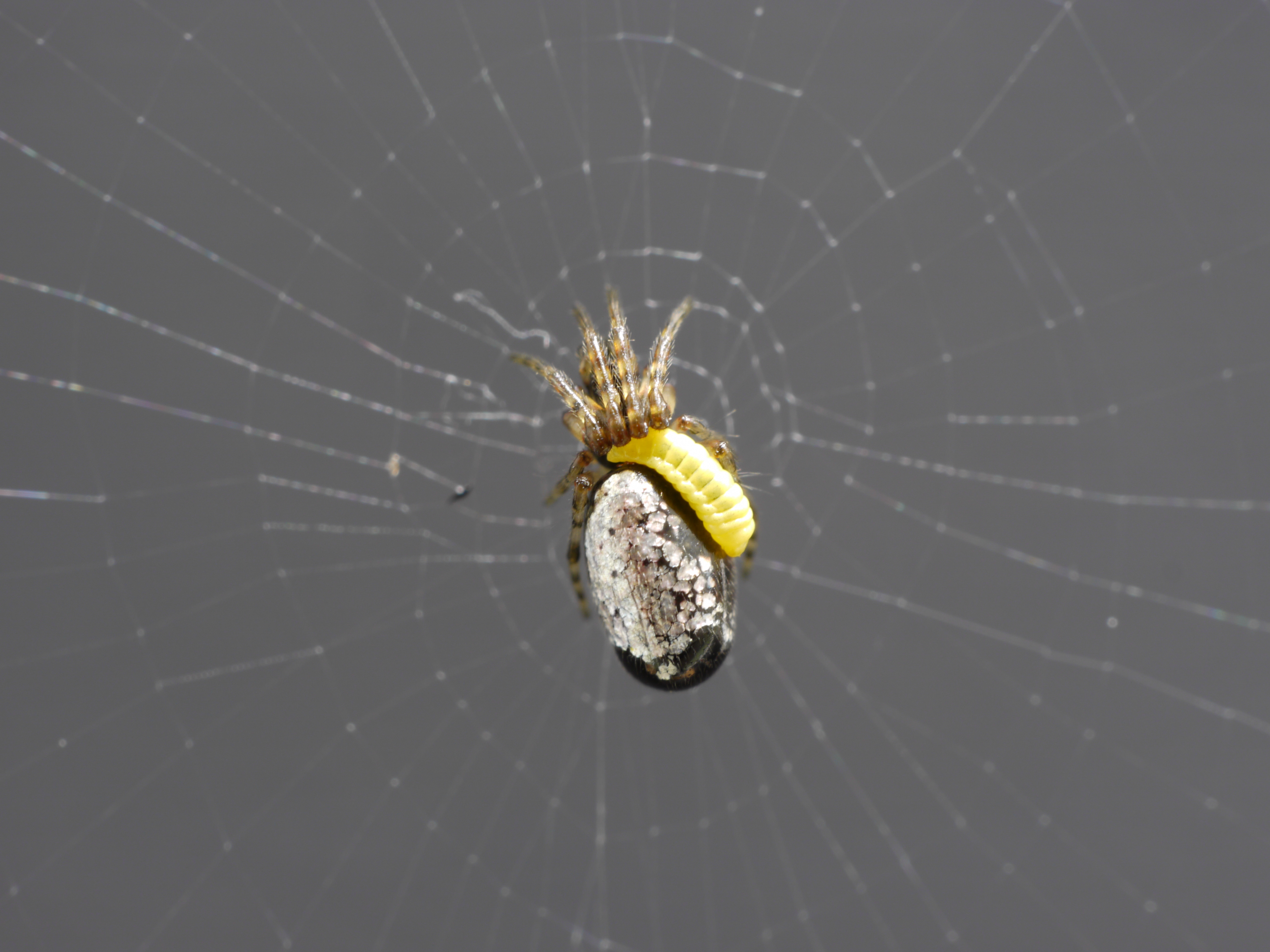
Cyclosa argenteoalba with parasitic larvae Reclinervellus nielseni attached

== Enemies ==
=== Predators ===
Some common predators of C. argenteoalba include wasps, parasitic flies, birds, jumping spiders that feed on other spiders, and praying mantises. C. argenteoalba's conspicuous silver coloring may be costly since they are more easily seen by their predators. Their web decorations are thought to deter predators by making them seem more intimidating.

=== Parasites ===
C. argenteoalba are often found with koinobiont parasitoid larvae attached to them. Koinobiont means they allow their host to continue being active during parasitism. One common example of parasitoid larvae often found on C. argenteoalba are polysphinctines such as Reclinervellus nielseni, which are a type of wasp. These parasites consume the spider hosts after the larvae have matured and then the parasites can complete metamorphosis. While the larvae are still attached, the spiders show behavior that seems to be manipulated by the larvae through their secretions. The spiders' webs were altered from the normal sticky spiral and instead constructed simplified "cocoon" webs with V-shaped radii, more hub loops, and silk decorations. Whether or not each specific web attribute was produced depended on when the parasite was removed from the spider, suggesting that each web feature is made independently. Even though the parasites' manipulation appeared quickly and was long-lasting, the spiders were eventually able to revert to their normal web-building some time after the larvae were removed. This manipulated behavior was more prominent and enduring the longer the parasites were left on the spiders.

== Mitochondrial genome ==
The complete mitochondrial genome of C. argenteoalba has been sequenced. It was found that the genome is majority A+T and includes 37 genes. The cloverleaf structure typically associated with transfer RNA is not successfully formed by thirteen of its transfer RNAs. The genome is 14,575 base pairs long. Phylogenetic analysis showed C. argenteoalba is closely related to Hypsosinga pygmaea and Araneus ventricosus.
