= Abbottina binhi =

Conservation status
- Data Deficient (IUCN 3.1)

Scientific classification
- Kingdom: Animalia
- Phylum: Chordata
- Class: Actinopterygii
- Division: Teleostei
- Order: Cypriniformes
- Suborder: Cyprinoidei
- Family: Gobionidae
- Genus: Abbottina
- Species: A. binhi

Binomial name
- Abbottina binhi V. H. Nguyễn, 2001

Species of fish

Abbottina binhi is a species of ray-finned fish in the genus Abbottina. It is endemic to the Bằng River in Cao Bằng Province, Vietnam. It is only known from its type series.
