= Diplostomum =

Scientific classification
- Kingdom: Animalia
- Phylum: Platyhelminthes
- Class: Trematoda
- Order: Diplostomida
- Family: Diplostomidae
- Genus: Diplostomum von Nordmann, 1832

Genus of flatworms

Diplostomum is a genus of flatworms belonging to the family Diplostomidae.

Species:

- Diplostomum auriflavum
- Diplostomum baeri
- Diplostomum chromatophorum
- Diplostomum pseudospathaceum
