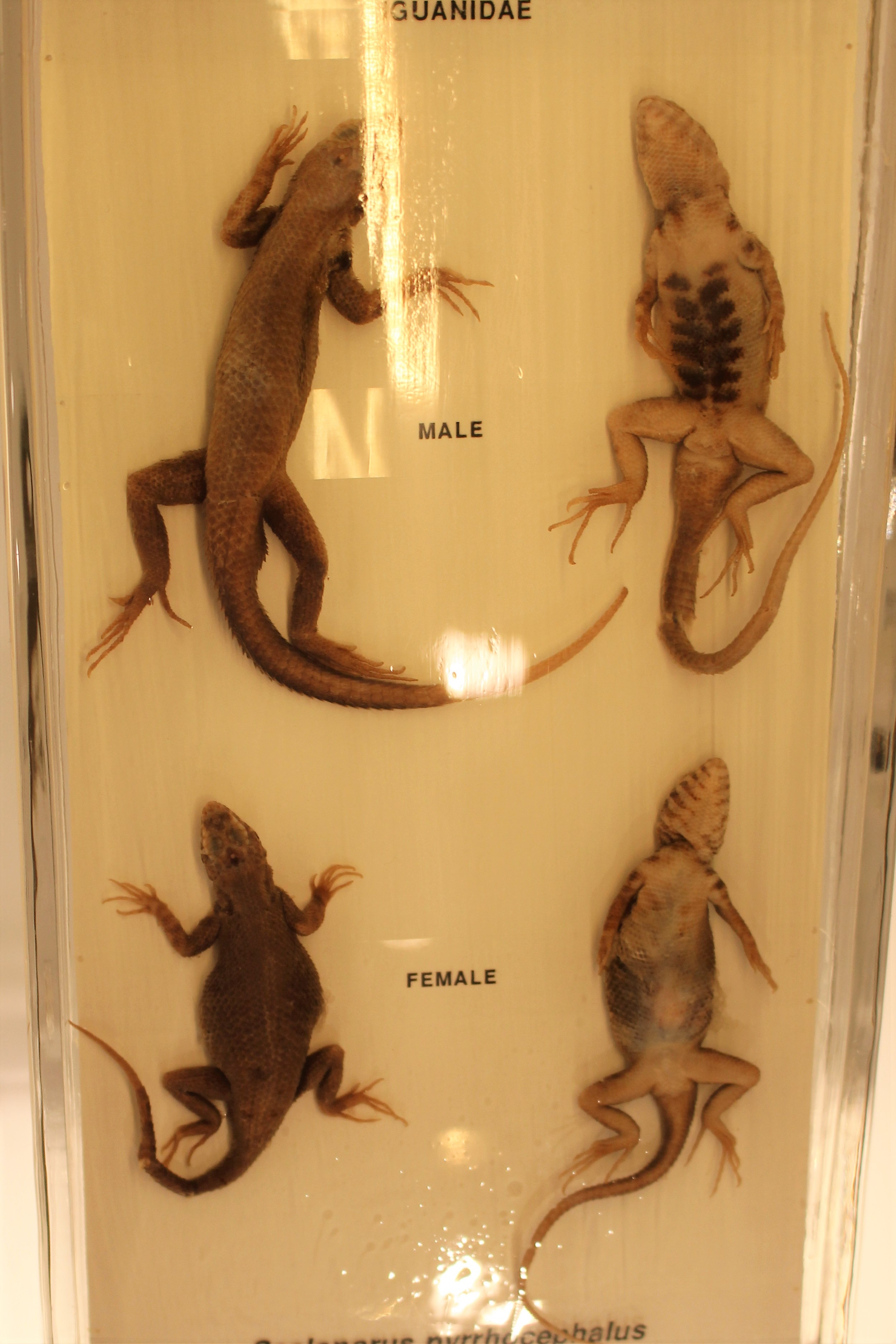
- Sceloporus pyrocephalus males and females, at the Cambridge University Museum of Zoology, England

Conservation status
- Least Concern (IUCN 3.1)

Scientific classification
- Domain: Eukaryota
- Kingdom: Animalia
- Phylum: Chordata
- Class: Reptilia
- Order: Squamata
- Suborder: Iguania
- Family: Phrynosomatidae
- Genus: Sceloporus
- Species: S. pyrocephalus

Binomial name
- Sceloporus pyrocephalus Cope, 1864

= Sceloporus pyrocephalus =

Species of lizard

Sceloporus pyrocephalus, the boulder spiny lizard or red-headed spiny lizard, is a species of lizard in the family Phrynosomatidae. It is endemic to Mexico.
