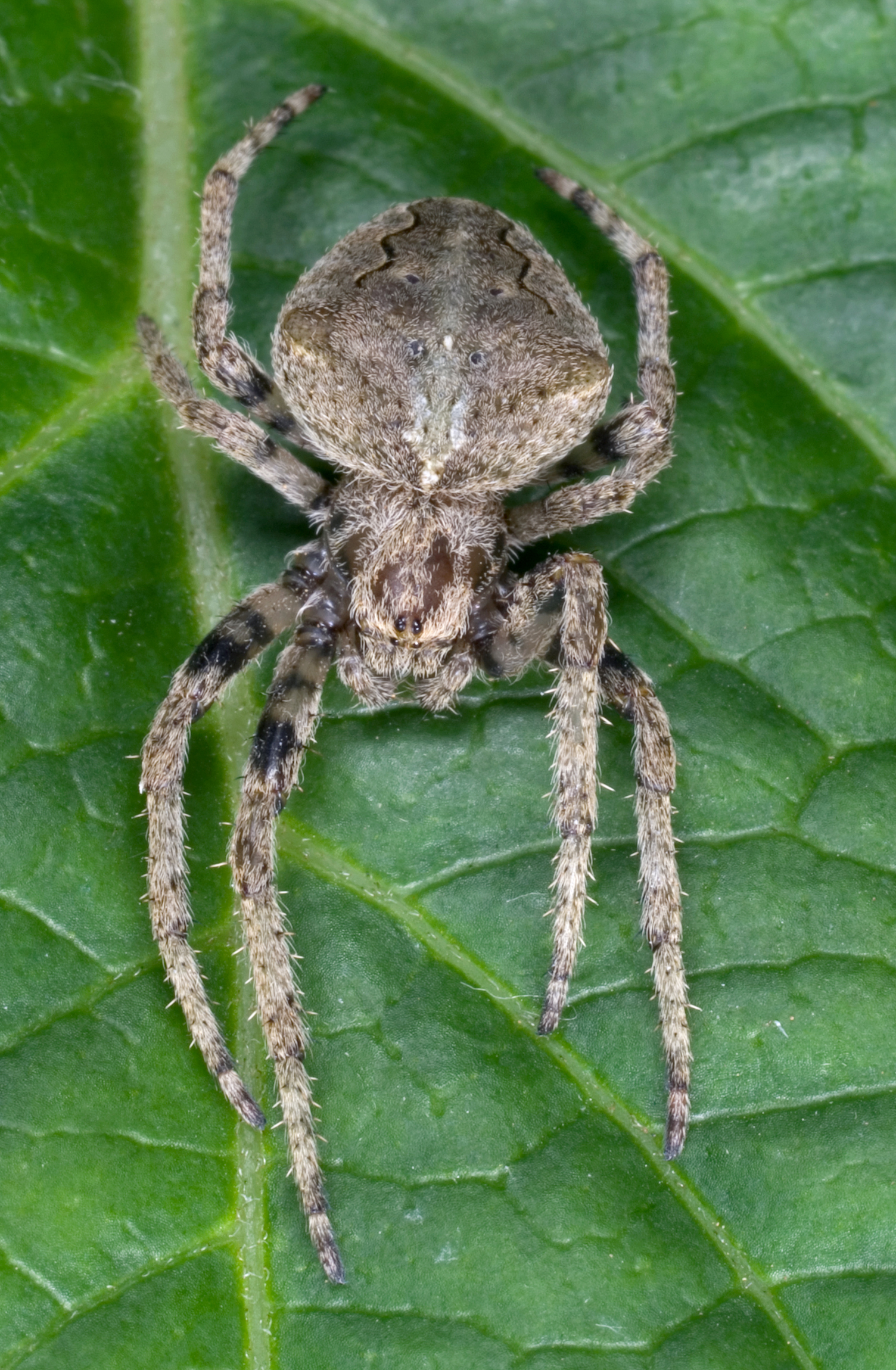

Scientific classification
- Kingdom: Animalia
- Phylum: Arthropoda
- Subphylum: Chelicerata
- Class: Arachnida
- Order: Araneae
- Infraorder: Araneomorphae
- Family: Araneidae
- Genus: Araneus
- Species: A. ventricosus

Binomial name
- Araneus ventricosus (L. Koch, 1878)

Synonyms
- Epeira ventricosa L. Koch, 1878; Epeira senta Karsch, 1879; Aranea pia Chamberlin, 1924; Aranea piata Roewer, 1942; Cathaistela ventricosa Archer, 1958

= Araneus ventricosus =

Species of spider

Araneus ventricosus is a nocturnal orb-weaver spider found in Russia (Far East), Korea, Japan, China, and Taiwan that has been involved in numerous research studies and is easily identified by its nocturnal web-building behavior. Araneus ventricosus venom is effective against invertebrate prey, but its venom is ineffective in vertebrates. Its silk has been researched extensively and has several unique properties. For instance, A. ventricosus is able to produce flagelliform silk, and its TuSp1 (tubuliform spidroin) and AcSp1 (aciniform spidroin) genes have been sequenced. The spider also has unique eyes that are affected by their circadian rhythm and imply the existence of an efferent optic nerve within the species' central nervous system.

== Description ==
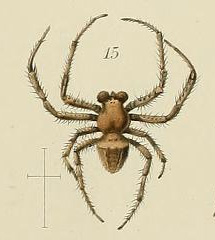
drawing of male in Bösenberg & Strand (1906)

Araneus ventricosus is a medium-sized orb-weaver spider commonly colored brown, black, or gray. Like other members of its family, it constructs circular webs to capture prey, but exhibits distinctive nocturnal behavior by building its web throughout the night and dismantling it each morning. During courtship, males perform elaborate mating displays as part of their reproductive behavior.

As adults, these spiders are predators that feed primarily on flying insects and other small arthropods caught in their webs. While A. ventricosus poses no significant threat to humans, it may occasionally bite larger animals when handled. The species exhibits selective venom toxicity - while highly effective against invertebrate prey, the venom shows no activity in vertebrates. Chemical analysis has revealed unique properties in the venom composition, including the previously undocumented presence of glutamic acid methylation in animal venoms, with protein databases identifying 130 distinct toxin-related protein chains.

== Taxonomy ==
The species was first described as Epeira ventricosa by L. Koch in 1878. The male was later described as Epeira senta by Karsch in 1879, but this was subsequently synonymized with A. ventricosus. The species has undergone several taxonomic revisions, including a temporary transfer to the genus Cathaistela by Archer in 1958, before being returned to Araneus.

== Distribution and habitat ==
A. ventricosus is distributed across East Asia, including Russia (Far East), Korea, Japan, China, and Taiwan. The spider primarily resides in garden, fields, and forest ecosystems.

== Spider silk characteristics ==
=== Flagelliform silk production ===
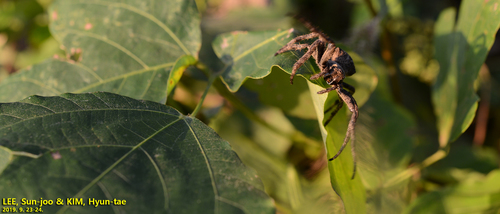
Araneus ventricosus walking on plant in South Korea

Araneus ventricosus is able to produce flagelliform silk, also known as dragline silk, which has been found to be the most elastic of all spider silk types. However, this highly valuable silk type is very difficult to create through artificial means. Since spider silk has a variety of potential uses, including in fabrics and biomedical technologies, the sequence motifs for genes coding for this silk in the species have been studied to examine the potential for artificial production. In the study by Lee et al., clones of the genes for this silk were produced and injected into insect cells to determine if future cells would also contain these genetic motifs. Since the later generations of this strain of cells were able to maintain the AvFlag tag, it was discovered that the species could potentially be used to produce large quantities of this dragline spider silk.

=== Spidroins ===
The spidroins that make up all types of spider silk are produced by glands. In orb-weaving spiders, like Araneus ventricosus, there are typically seven or fewer of these glands. The silk proteins created by the glands include flagelliform spidroins, called Flag; tubuliform spidroins, called TuSp; aciniform spidroins, called AcSp; aggregate spidroins, called AgSp; pyriform spidroins, called PySp; and major and minor ampullate spidroins, respectively called MaSp and MiSp. Of these proteins, AcSp and TuSp help to create egg coverings, while the other five are involved in the spider silk's structure. However, thanks to recent analysis of the Araneus ventricosus genome, it has been discovered that there may be more than these seven spidroin types. Tubuliform silk, which may also be called cylindriform silk, is used to develop egg coverings, so it is only produced by glands in female spiders. One specific tubuliform spidroin gene in Araneus ventricosus, TuSp1, has been studied using a long distance polymerase chain reaction. Through this study, it was found that 1921 amino acid residues with 9 collective repeats can be coded for by the gene's main component.

Aciniform silk, on the other hand, is involved in prey-wrapping behaviors along with creating egg coverings. With these two uses, this form of spider silk is much stronger and more flexible than most other silk types, making it a valuable research subject. For instance, similarly to the TuSp1 gene, a long distance PCR was performed on the gene for the aciniform spidroins in Araneus ventricosus, AcSp1. This procedure found that AcSp1 produces a protein with 3445 amino acids and contains 10338 base pairs.

== Morphology ==
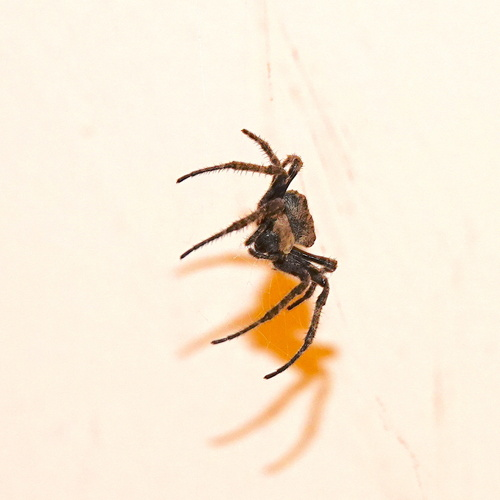
An Araneus ventricosus spider in its web, as found in Meguminonishi, Japan.

=== Eye cells and sensitivity ===
Orb-weavers' anterior median eyes have three types of eye cells - blue, ultraviolet, and green. In noct-diurnal spiders, meaning those active during both the day and night, the blue eye cells have been found to be most responsive to circadian systems. In the nocturnal Araneus ventricosus, it has then been found that their anterior median eyes are able to change sensitivity in accordance with their circadian rhythm, meaning that the spider likely has an efferent optic nerve. Additionally, their eyes are unable to find differences in color and have only one type of photoreceptor.

=== Central nervous system ===
The central nervous system of Araneus ventricosus contains fused supraesophageal ganglia, which are then composed of substantially-sized clusters of neurons. These supraesophageal ganglia eventually lead to the spider's four pairs of eyes through the optic nerve. The leading portion of the nerve cord then consists of the subesophageal ganglia, including the ventral subesophageal mass. The subesophageal ganglia, unlike the supraesophageal ganglia, are responsible for the nerves tied to the spider's appendages and pedipalps. Furthermore, the Araneus ventricosus subesophageal mass and brain both lack soma, or cell bodies, in the neurons of their central fibrous masses.
