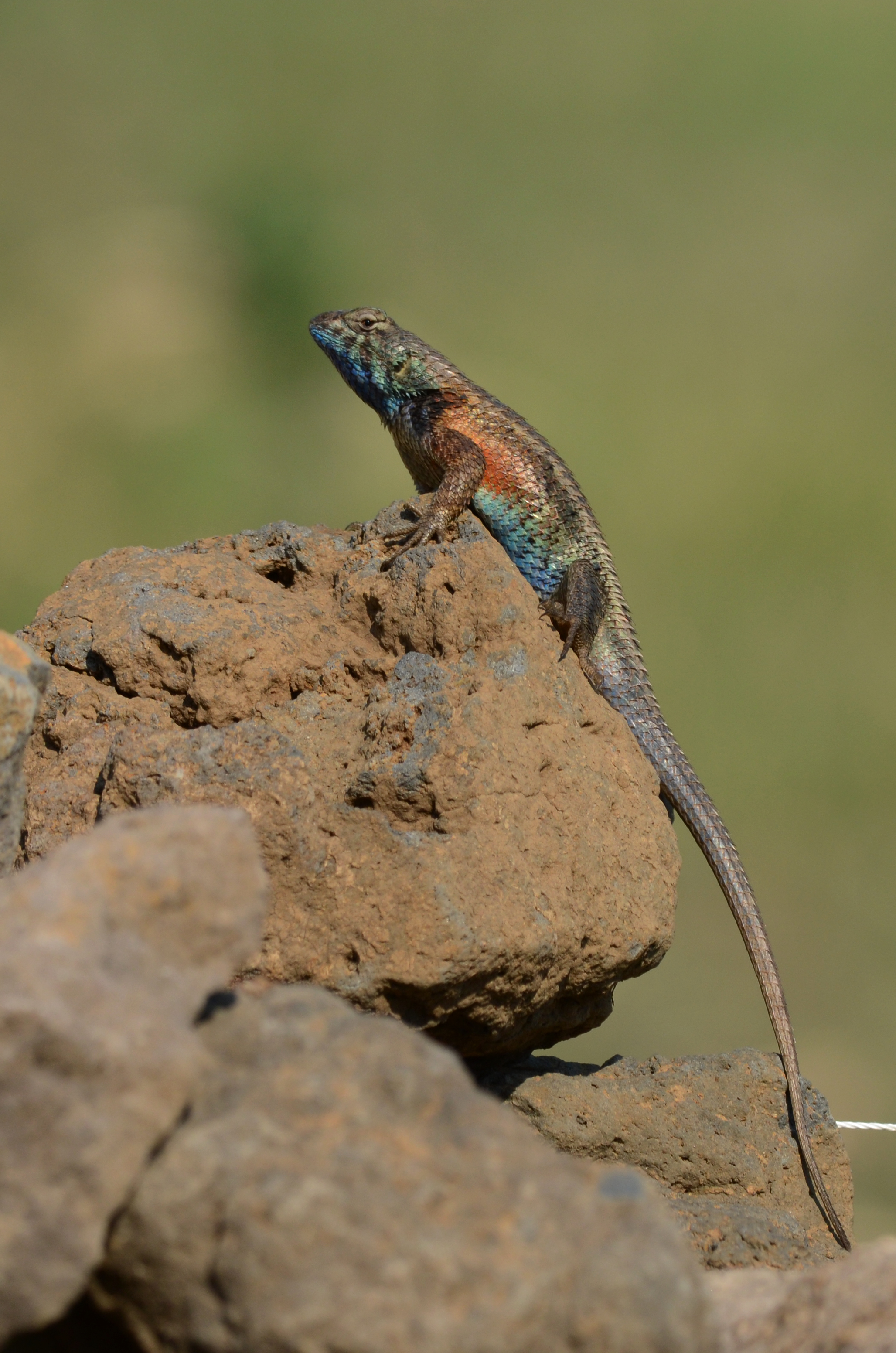
- male in Mexico

Conservation status
- Least Concern (IUCN 3.1)

Scientific classification
- Domain: Eukaryota
- Kingdom: Animalia
- Phylum: Chordata
- Class: Reptilia
- Order: Squamata
- Suborder: Iguania
- Family: Phrynosomatidae
- Genus: Sceloporus
- Species: S. horridus

Binomial name
- Sceloporus horridus Wiegmann, 1834

= Sceloporus horridus =

Horrible spiny lizard

Species of lizard

Sceloporus horridus, the horrible spiny lizard, rough lizard, or southern rough lizard, is a species of lizard in the family Phrynosomatidae. It is endemic to Mexico.

== Gallery ==
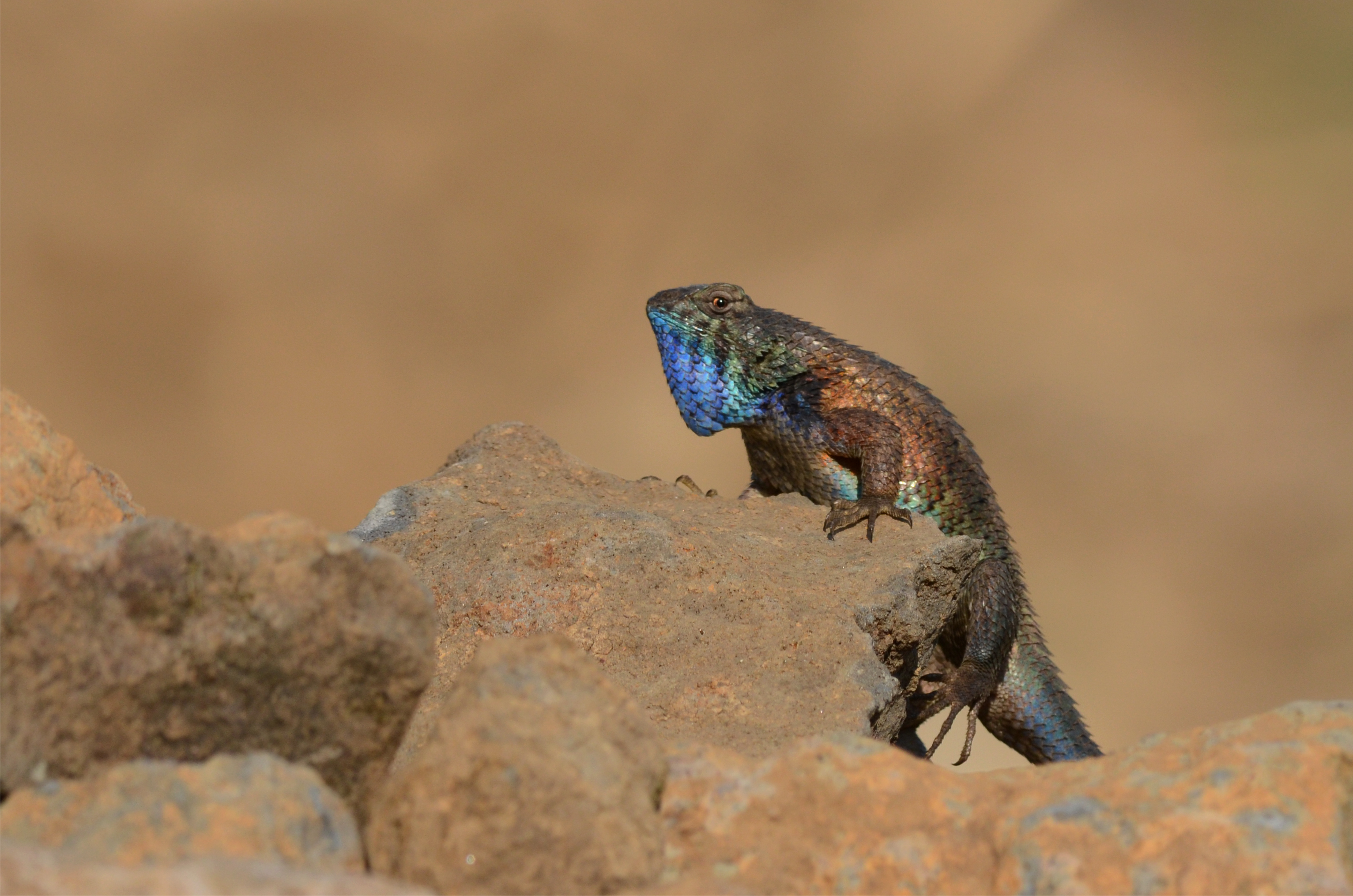
Displaying male

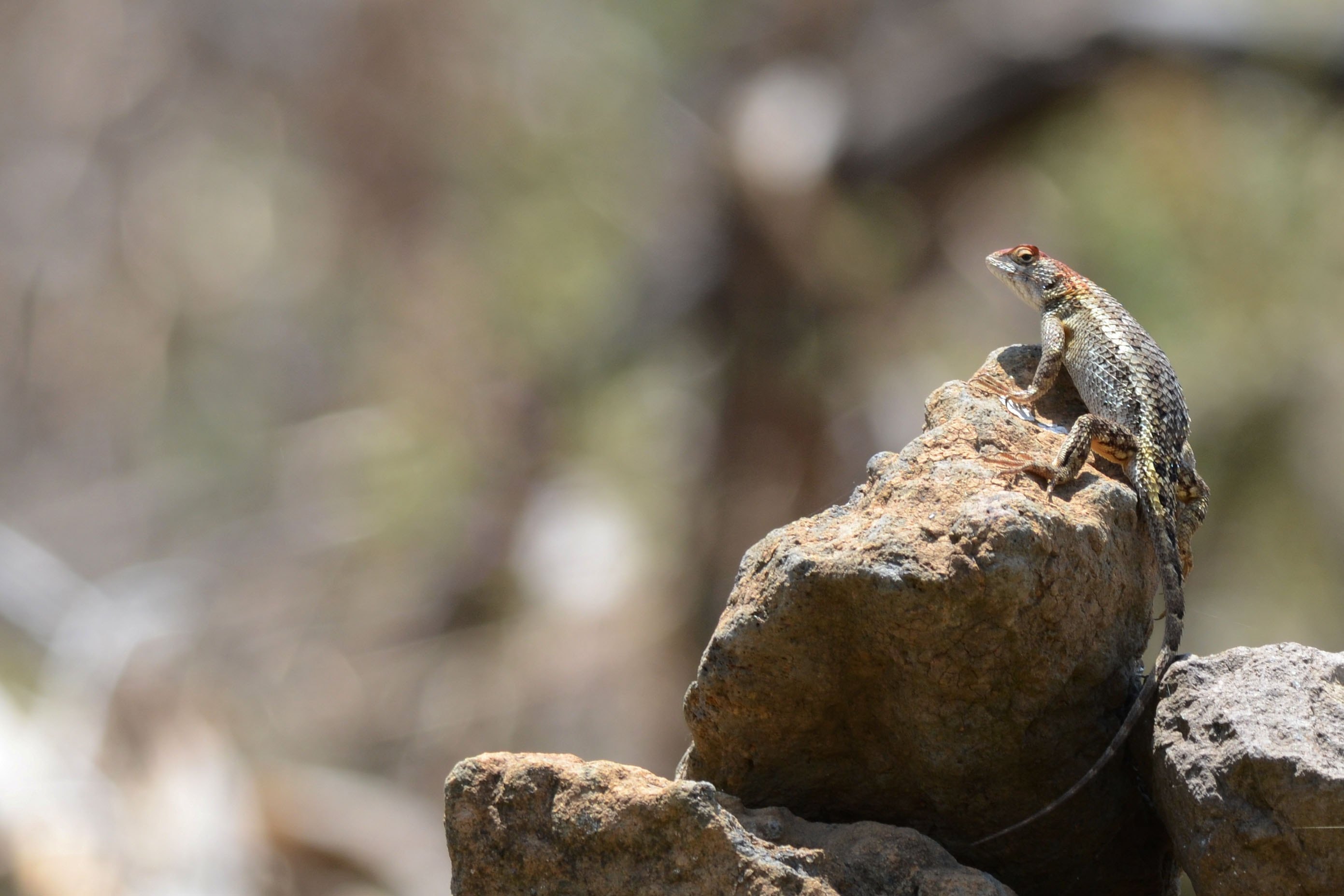
Female
