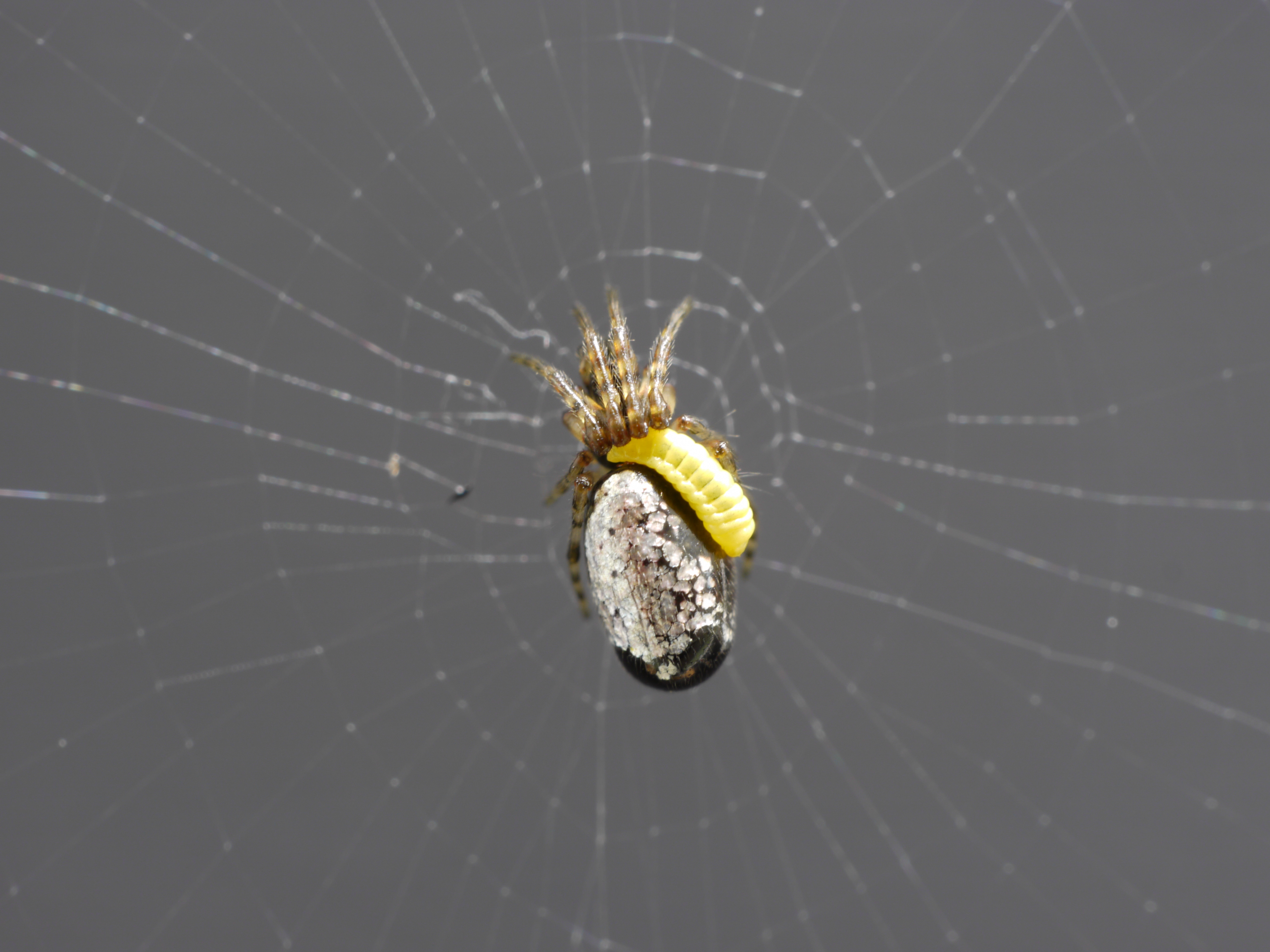
- A larva of R. nielseni parasitizing C. argenteoalba in Japan.

Scientific classification
- Kingdom: Animalia
- Phylum: Arthropoda
- Clade: Pancrustacea
- Class: Insecta
- Order: Hymenoptera
- Family: Ichneumonidae
- Subfamily: Pimplinae
- Tribe: Ephialtini
- Genus: Reclinervellus; He & Ye, 1998
- Species: R. nielseni

Binomial name
- Reclinervellus nielseni (Roman, 1923)

Synonyms
- Polysphincta nielseni Roman, 1923

= Reclinervellus nielseni =

Species of wasp

Reclinervellus nielseni is one of the spider-ectoparasitoids belonging to the Polysphincta genus-group (Hymenoptera, Ichneumonidae, Pimplinae) and utilizes exclusively Cyclosa spiders (Araneae, Araneidae) as hosts. The species is distributed from Britain to Japan but is rather sparse.

== Behavior ==
Reclinervellus nielseni is known to manipulate web-building behavior of the host spider to modify an original fragile orb-web into a simple and durable web with conspicuous web decorations. The host spider species is different in accordance with the region, that is Cyclosa conica in Europe whereas Cyclosa argenteoalba in Japan. The modified web is derived from a pre-programmed resting web constructed before spiders' molting, verified by the conformity of web shape and the presence of specific web decoration. The web decorations are thought to serve as a web-advertiser toward flying potential web destroyers (birds and insects). The web is conspicuous under ultraviolet light, and stronger than the typical resting web. Although the molting web structure usually only lasts the two days the spider takes to molt, the larvae remain within their spider-cocoon for up to ten days before hatching.
