= Host (biology) =

Organism that harbours another organism

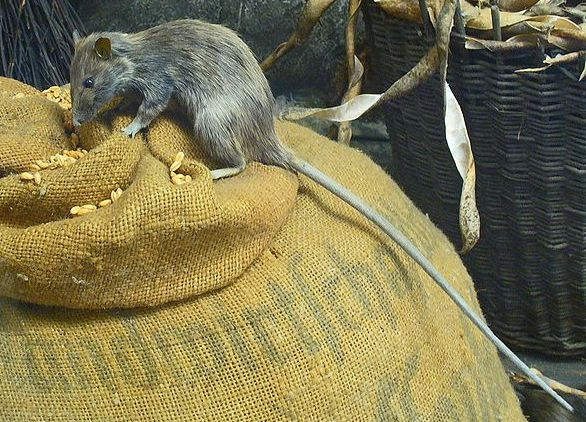
The black rat is a reservoir host for bubonic plague. The rat fleas that infest the rats are vectors for the disease.

In biology and medicine, a host is a larger organism that harbours a smaller organism; whether a parasitic, a mutualistic, or a commensalist guest (symbiont). The guest is typically provided with nourishment and shelter. Examples include animals playing host to parasitic worms (e.g. nematodes), cells harbouring pathogenic (disease-causing) viruses, or a bean plant hosting mutualistic (helpful) nitrogen-fixing bacteria. More specifically in botany, a host plant supplies food resources to micropredators, which have an evolutionarily stable relationship with their hosts similar to ectoparasitism. The host range is the collection of hosts that an organism can use as a partner.

== Symbiosis ==
Symbiosis spans a wide variety of possible relationships between organisms, differing in their permanence and their effects on the two parties. If one of the partners in an association is much larger than the other, it is generally known as the host. In parasitism, the parasite benefits at the host's expense. In commensalism, the two live together without harming each other, while in mutualism, both parties benefit.

Most parasites are only parasitic for part of their life cycle. By comparing parasites with their closest free-living relatives, parasitism has been shown to have evolved on at least 233 separate occasions. Some organisms live in close association with a host and only become parasitic when environmental conditions deteriorate.

A parasite may have a long-term relationship with its host, as is the case with all endoparasites. The guest seeks out the host and obtains food or another service from it, but does not usually kill it. In contrast, a parasitoid spends a large part of its life within or on a single host, ultimately causing the host's death, with some of the strategies involved verging on predation. Generally, the host is kept alive until the parasitoid is fully grown and ready to pass on to its next life stage. A guest's relationship with its host may be intermittent or temporary, perhaps associated with multiple hosts, making the relationship equivalent to the herbivory of a wild-living animal. Another possibility is that the host–guest relationship may have no permanent physical contact, as in the brood parasitism of the cuckoo.

== Hosts to parasites ==
Micropredator, parasite, parasitoid, and predator strategies compared. Their interactions with their hosts form a continuum. Micropredation and parasitoidism are now considered to be evolutionary strategies within parasitism.

Parasites follow a wide variety of evolutionary strategies, placing their hosts in an equally wide range of relationships. Parasitism implies host–parasite coevolution, including the maintenance of gene polymorphisms in the host, where there is a trade-off between the advantage of resistance to a parasite and a cost such as disease caused by the gene.

=== Types of hosts ===
- Definitive or primary host – an organism in which the parasite reaches the adult stage and reproduces sexually, if possible. This is the final host.
- Secondary or intermediate host – an organism that harbors the sexually immature parasite and is required by the parasite to undergo development and complete its life cycle. It often acts as a vector of the parasite to reach its definitive host. For example, Dirofilaria immitis, the heartworm of dogs, uses the mosquito as its intermediate host until it matures into the infective L_{3} larval stage.

It is not always easy or even possible to identify which host is definitive and which secondary. The life cycles of many parasites are not well understood, and the subjectively or economically more important organism may initially be designated incorrectly as primary. Mislabelling may continue even after the error becomes known. For example trout and salmon are sometimes said to be "primary hosts" for salmonid whirling disease, even though the myxosporean parasite reproduces sexually inside the sludge worm. And where the host harbors the different parasite's phases at different sites within its body, the host is both intermediate and definitive: for example trichinosis, a disease caused by roundworms, where the host has immature juveniles in its muscles and reproductive adults in its digestive tract.

- Paratenic or transport host – an organism that harbors the sexually immature parasite but is not necessary for the parasite's development cycle to progress. Paratenic hosts serve as "dumps" for non-mature stages of a parasite in which they can accumulate in high numbers. The trematode Alaria americana is an example: the so-called mesocercarial stages of this parasite reside in tadpoles, which are rarely eaten by the definitive canine host. The tadpoles (or the frogs, following metamorphosis) are more frequently preyed on by snakes, which then function as paratenic hosts: the mesocercariae do not undergo further development there, but may accumulate, and infect the definitive host once the snake is consumed by a canid. The nematode Skrjabingylus nasicola is another example, with slugs as the intermediate hosts, shrews and rodents as the paratenic hosts, and mustelids as the definitive hosts.
- Dead-end, incidental, or accidental host – an organism that generally does not allow transmission to the definitive host, thereby preventing the parasite from completing its development. For example, humans and horses are dead-end hosts for West Nile virus, whose life cycle is normally between culicine mosquitoes and birds. People and horses can become infected, but the level of virus in their blood does not become high enough to pass on the infection to mosquitoes that bite them.
- Reservoir host – an organism that harbors a pathogen but suffers no ill effects. However, it serves as a source of infection to other species that are susceptible, with important implications for disease control. A reservoir host individual may be reinfected several times.

=== Plant hosts of micropredators ===
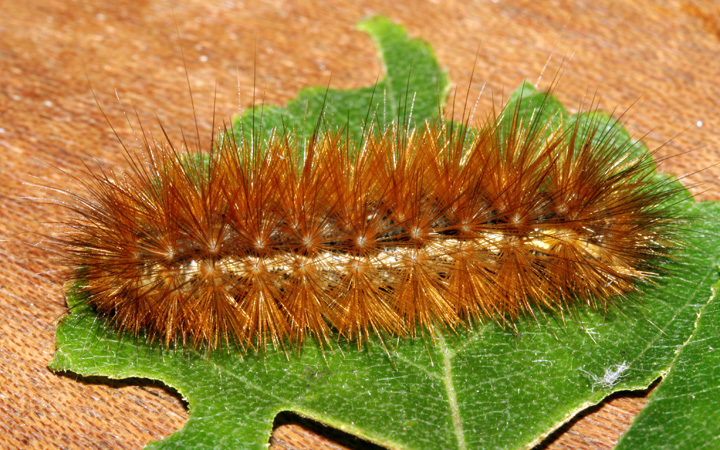
Buff ermine moth caterpillar, a polyphagous micropredator

Micropredation is an evolutionarily stable strategy within parasitism, in which a small predator lives parasitically on a much larger host plant, eating parts of it.

The range of plants on which a herbivorous insect feeds is known as its host range. This can be wide or narrow, but it never includes all plants. A small number of insects are monophagous, feeding on a single plant. The silkworm larva is one of these, with mulberry leaves being the only food consumed. More often, an insect with a limited host range is oligophagous, being restricted to a few closely related species, usually in the same plant family. The diamondback moth is an example of this, feeding exclusively on brassicas, and the larva of the potato tuber moth feeds on potatoes, tomatoes and tobacco, all members of the same plant family, Solanaceae. Herbivorous insects with a wide range of hosts in various different plant families are known as polyphagous. One example is the buff ermine moth whose larvae feed on alder, mint, plantain, oak, rhubarb, currant, blackberry, dock, ragwort, nettle and honeysuckle.

Influenza virus can change by genetic reassortment as it travels between different hosts in its range.

Plants often produce toxic or unpalatable secondary metabolites to deter herbivores from feeding on them. Monophagous insects have developed specific adaptations to overcome those in their specialist hosts, giving them an advantage over polyphagous species. However, this puts them at greater risk of extinction if their chosen hosts suffer setbacks. Monophagous species are able to feed on the tender young foliage with high concentrations of damaging chemicals on which polyphagous species cannot feed, having to make do with older leaves. There is a trade off between offspring quality and quantity; the specialist maximises the chances of its young thriving by paying great attention to the choice of host, while the generalist produces larger numbers of eggs in sub-optimal conditions.

Some insect micropredators migrate regularly from one host to another. The hawthorn-carrot aphid overwinters on its primary host, a hawthorn tree, and migrates during the summer to its secondary host, a plant in the carrot family.

=== Host range ===
The host range is the set of hosts that a parasite can use as a partner. In the case of human parasites, the host range influences the epidemiology of the parasitism or disease.

==== Host range of viruses ====
For instance, the production of antigenic shifts in Influenza A virus can result from pigs being infected with the virus from several different hosts (such as human and bird). This co-infection provides an opportunity for mixing of the viral genes between existing strains, thereby producing a new viral strain. An influenza vaccine produced against an existing viral strain might not be effective against this new strain, which then requires a new influenza vaccine to be prepared for the protection of the human population.

== Non-parasitic associations ==
=== Mutualistic hosts ===
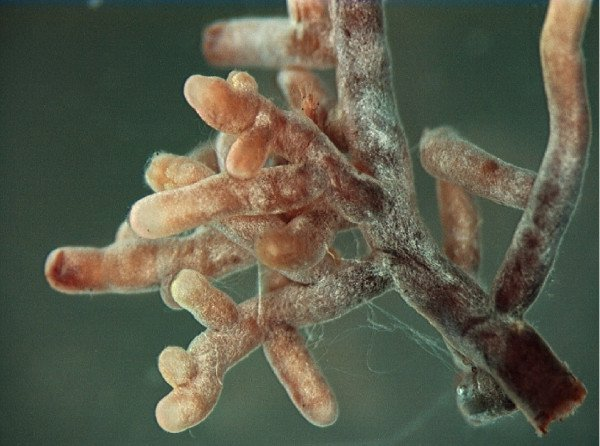
Mycorrhiza, a mutualistic interaction between a plant's roots and a fungus

Some hosts participate in fully mutualistic interactions with both organisms being completely dependent on the other. For example, termites are hosts to the protozoa that live in their gut and which digest cellulose, and the human gut flora is essential for efficient digestion. Many corals and other marine invertebrates house zooxanthellae, single-celled algae, in their tissues. The host provides a protected environment in a well-lit position for the algae, while benefiting itself from the nutrients produced by photosynthesis which supplement its diet. Lamellibrachia luymesi, a deep sea giant tubeworm, has an obligate mutualistic association with internal, sulfide-oxidizing, bacterial symbionts. The tubeworm extracts the chemicals that the bacteria need from the sediment, and the bacteria supply the tubeworm, which has no mouth, with nutrients. Some hermit crabs place pieces of sponge on the shell in which they are living. These grow over and eventually dissolve away the mollusc shell; the crab may not ever need to replace its abode again and is well-camouflaged by the overgrowth of sponge.

An important hosting relationship is mycorrhiza, a symbiotic association between a fungus and the roots of a vascular host plant. The fungus receives carbohydrates, the products of photosynthesis, while the plant receives phosphates and nitrogenous compounds acquired by the fungus from the soil. Over 95% of plant families have been shown to have mycorrhizal associations. Another such relationship is between leguminous plants and certain nitrogen-fixing bacteria called rhizobia that form nodules on the roots of the plant. The host supplies the bacteria with the energy needed for nitrogen fixation and the bacteria provide much of the nitrogen needed by the host. Such crops as beans, peas, chickpeas and alfalfa are able to fix nitrogen in this way, and mixing clover with grasses increases the yield of pastures.

Neurotransmitter tyramine produced by commensal Providencia bacteria, which colonize the gut of the nematode Caenorhabditis elegans, bypasses the requirement for its host to biosynthesise tyramine. This product is then probably converted to octopamine by the host enzyme tyramine β-hydroxylase and manipulates a host sensory decision.

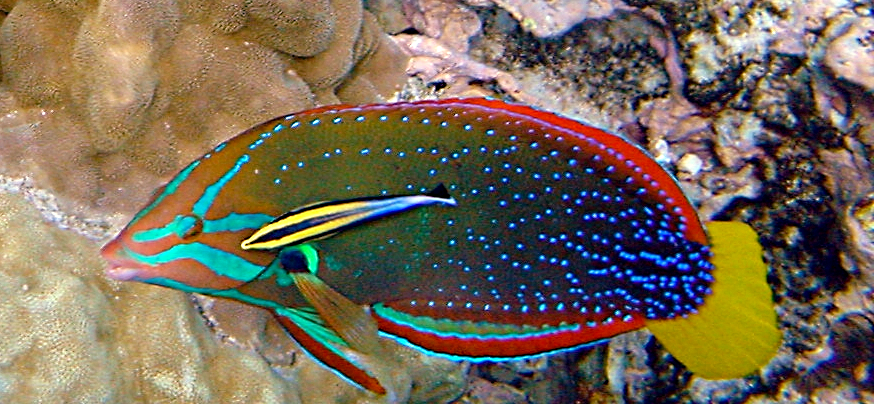
Cleaning symbiosis: a Hawaiian cleaner wrasse with its client, a yellowtail wrasse

=== Hosts in cleaning symbiosis ===
Hosts of many species are involved in cleaning symbiosis, both in the sea and on land, making use of smaller animals to clean them of parasites. Cleaners include fish, shrimps and birds; hosts or clients include a much wider range of fish, marine reptiles including turtles and iguanas, octopus, whales, and terrestrial mammals. The host appears to benefit from the interaction, but biologists have disputed whether this is a truly mutualistic relationship or something closer to parasitism by the cleaner.

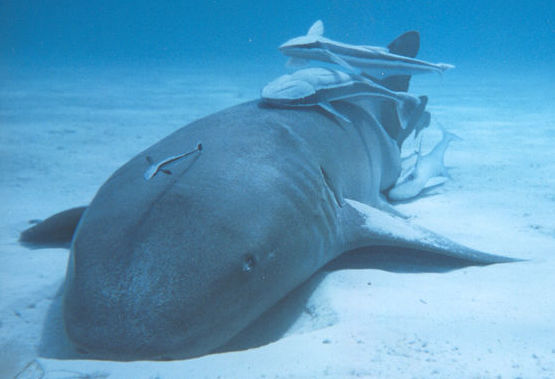
Nurse shark playing host to commensal remoras, which gain a free ride and which may serve as cleaners

=== Commensal hosts ===
Remoras (also called suckerfish) can swim freely but have evolved suckers that enable them to adhere to smooth surfaces, gaining a free ride (phoresis), and they spend most of their lives clinging to a host animal such as a whale, turtle or shark. However, the relationship may be mutualistic, as remoras, though not generally considered to be cleaner fish, often consume parasitic copepods: for example, these are found in the stomach contents of 70% of the common remora. Many molluscs, barnacles and polychaete worms attach themselves to the carapace of the Atlantic horseshoe crab; for some this is a convenient arrangement, but for others it is an obligate form of commensalism and they live nowhere else.

== History ==
The first host to be noticed in ancient times was human: human parasites such as hookworm are recorded from ancient Egypt from 3000 BC onwards, while in ancient Greece, the Hippocratic Corpus describes human bladder worm. The medieval Persian physician Avicenna recorded human and animal parasites including roundworms, threadworms, the Guinea worm and tapeworms. In Early Modern times, Francesco Redi recorded animal parasites, while the microscopist Antonie van Leeuwenhoek observed and illustrated the protozoan Giardia lamblia from "his own loose stools".

Hosts to mutualistic symbionts were recognised more recently, when in 1877 Albert Bernhard Frank described the mutualistic relationship between a fungus and an alga in lichens.

== See also ==
- PHI-base (Pathogen-Host Interaction database)
- Generalist and specialist species
- Host cell protein
