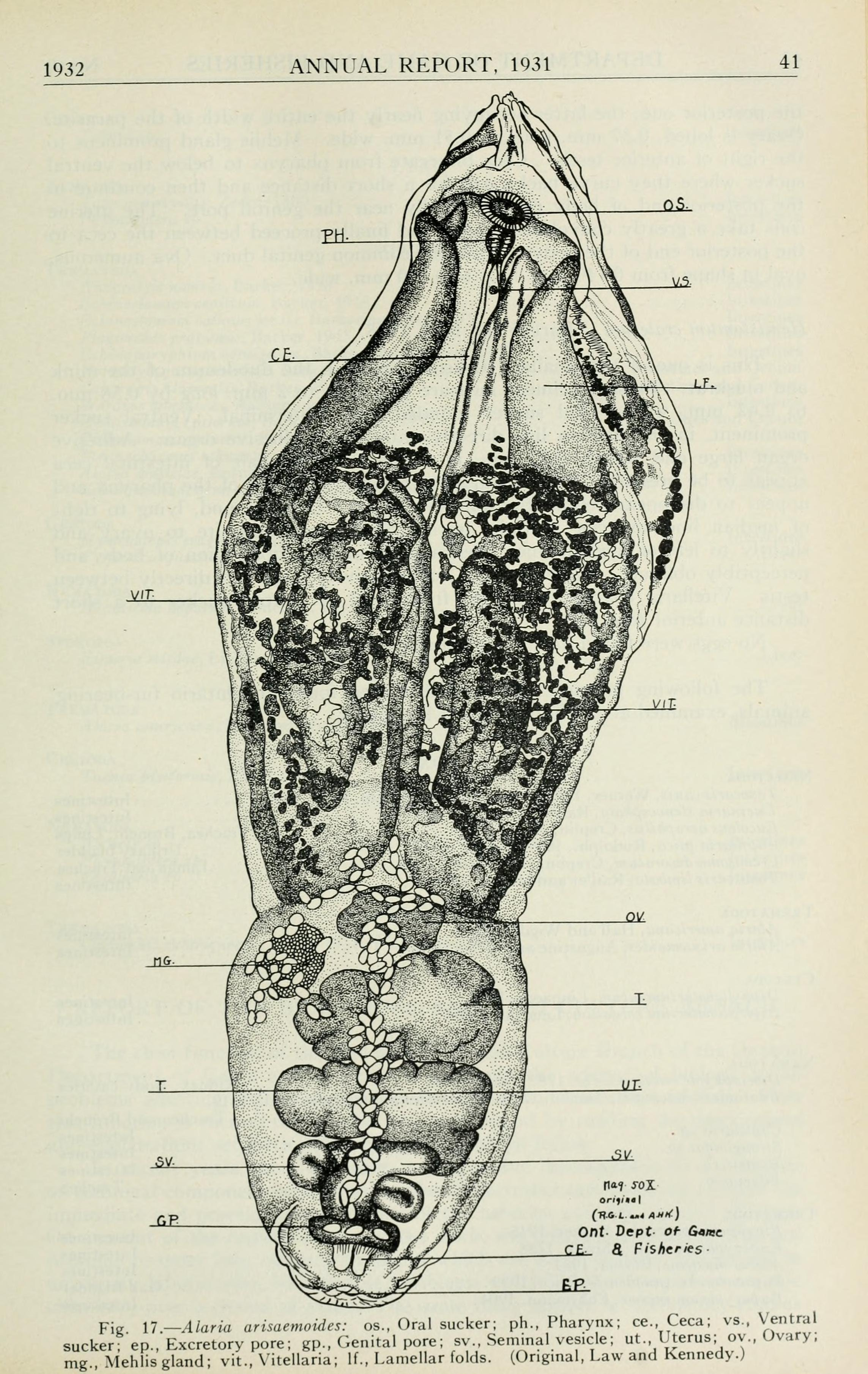
- Alaria arisaemoides

Scientific classification
- Kingdom: Animalia
- Phylum: Platyhelminthes
- Class: Trematoda
- Order: Diplostomida
- Suborder: Diplostomata
- Superfamily: Diplostomoidea
- Family: Diplostomidae; Poirier, 1886

Subfamilies
- Alariinae Hall & Wigdor, 1918; Codonocephalinae Sudarikov, 1959; Crassiphialinae Sudarikov, 1960; Diplostominae Poirier, 1886

= Diplostomidae =

Family of flukes

Diplostomidae is a family of trematodes in the order Diplostomida.

== Genera ==
- Austrodiplostomum Szidat & Nani, 1951
- Bolbophorus Dubois, 1935
- Bursacetabulus Tehrany, Dronen & Wardle, 1999
- Bursatintinnabulus Tehrany, Dronen & Wardle, 1999
- Diplostomum Nordmann, 1832
- Harvardia Baer, 1932
- Hysteromorpha Lutz, 1931
- Mesoophorodiplostomum Dubois, 1936
- Neodiplostomum Railliet, 1919
- Posthodiplostomum Dubois, 1936
- Tylodelphys Diesing, 1850

Additionally, the World Register of Marine Species lists Diplostomulum as a larval group name.
