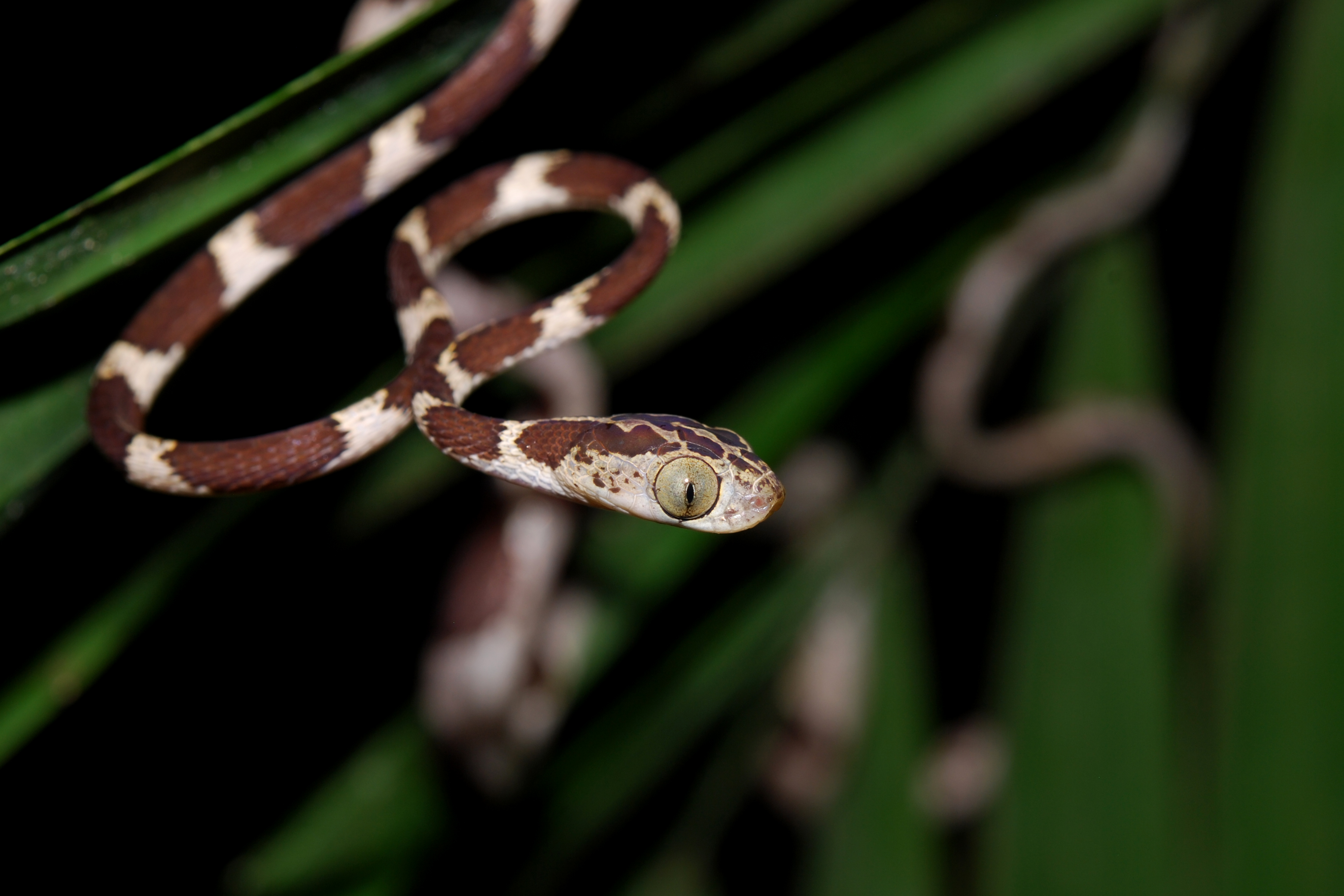
- Yasuní National Park

Conservation status
- Least Concern (IUCN 3.1)

Scientific classification
- Kingdom: Animalia
- Phylum: Chordata
- Class: Reptilia
- Order: Squamata
- Suborder: Serpentes
- Family: Colubridae
- Genus: Imantodes
- Species: I. cenchoa

Binomial name
- Imantodes cenchoa (Linnaeus, 1758)

Synonyms
- Coluber cenchoa Linnaeus, 1758; Imantodes cenchoa (Linnaeus, 1758); Himantodes cenchoa (Linnaeus, 1758); Dipsas cenchoa (Linnaeus, 1758)

= Imantodes cenchoa =

Species of snake

Imantodes cenchoa, also known commonly as the blunthead tree snake, the neotropical blunt-headed tree snake, and the fiddle-string snake, is a species of mildly venomous, rear-fanged snake in the subfamily Dipsadinae of the family Colubridae. The species is native to Mexico, Central America, and South America.

== Description ==
The blunthead tree snake averages about 800 mm (31 in) in total length (tail included). Maximum total length is about 1.5 m (4 ft 11 in). Imantodes cenchoa is known for its long, extremely slender body and large head. The pupil of its eye is very distinct from other snakes. Most snakes found around the world are known to have very poor vision and rely mostly on smell and vibrations to detect signs of prey and predators. Arboreal snakes have much better vision than other snakes. The blunthead tree snake has a vertical slit for a pupil which allows the snake to look downward. This trait gives the blunthead tree snake an advantage over other snakes. The large eyes make up approximately 26% of its head.

The ventral surface, or stomach, of the blunthead tree snake is mostly white, while the dorsal surface, or top, is a light or pale brown with lateral dark brown patches that begin at the head and continue down the length of the body. The northern and southern populations of the blunthead tree snake exhibit different sexual dimorphism, the existence of two different traits of a species in the same population. For example, northern males have a slightly longer tail whereas the males of southern populations have a shorter tail. In some regions females typically have a much larger head than males.

== Habitat ==
The blunthead tree snake is arboreal. It is most often found in low vegetation such as coffee trees or bromeliads. It prefers cooler and moist areas such as wet forests and rainforests. It is found at altitudes from sea level to 1,700 m (5,600 ft).

== Geographic range ==
Imantodes cenchoa is found in Mexico, most of Central America, and parts of South America south to northernmost Argentina. Specifically, it has been recorded in eastern Mexico, Guatemala, Honduras, Belize, El Salvador, Nicaragua, Costa Rica, Panama, Colombia, Venezuela, Trinidad and Tobago, French Guiana, Brazil, Ecuador, Peru, Bolivia, Paraguay, and northern Argentina.

== Behavior ==
Because the blunthead tree snake is nocturnal, it can be found in a resting coiled position in very shaded areas during the day. At night it forages for food through dense vegetation on the ground up to its resting places in the trees.

== Reproduction ==
The blunthead tree snake is a polygynandrous reptile. Mating seasons can vary depending on the rainy seasons of its habitat. Some snakes mate year round, but the mating season of others may be synchronized with the wet and rainy seasons of their environment. For example, in areas with long rainy seasons I. cenchoa tends to show a much longer mating season compared to snakes in areas with shorter rainy seasons. The blunthead tree snake is an oviparous or egg-laying animal that has little or no embryonic development within the mother. Some blunthead tree snakes exhibit continuous reproduction depending on the environment that they live in. However, in an area that has seasonal rainfall, egg laying and hatching positively correlates with the rainy seasons. In Guatemala and Mexico for example, female snakes lay their eggs between June and July. These eggs will hatch around July and August, which are the typically rainy seasons in these countries. On the other hand, snakes in Brazil exhibit continuous reproduction. The eggs are laid from November to January and start to hatch around March throughout August. Both male and female blunthead tree snake reach sexual maturity about two years after hatching or at around 620 mm (24 in) SVL (snout-to-vent length). The female snake can lay from one to three eggs, typically called a clutch, per breeding season depending on the size of the snake, its food habits, and environmental factors. The female will leave her eggs after laying them, not presenting parental care traits.

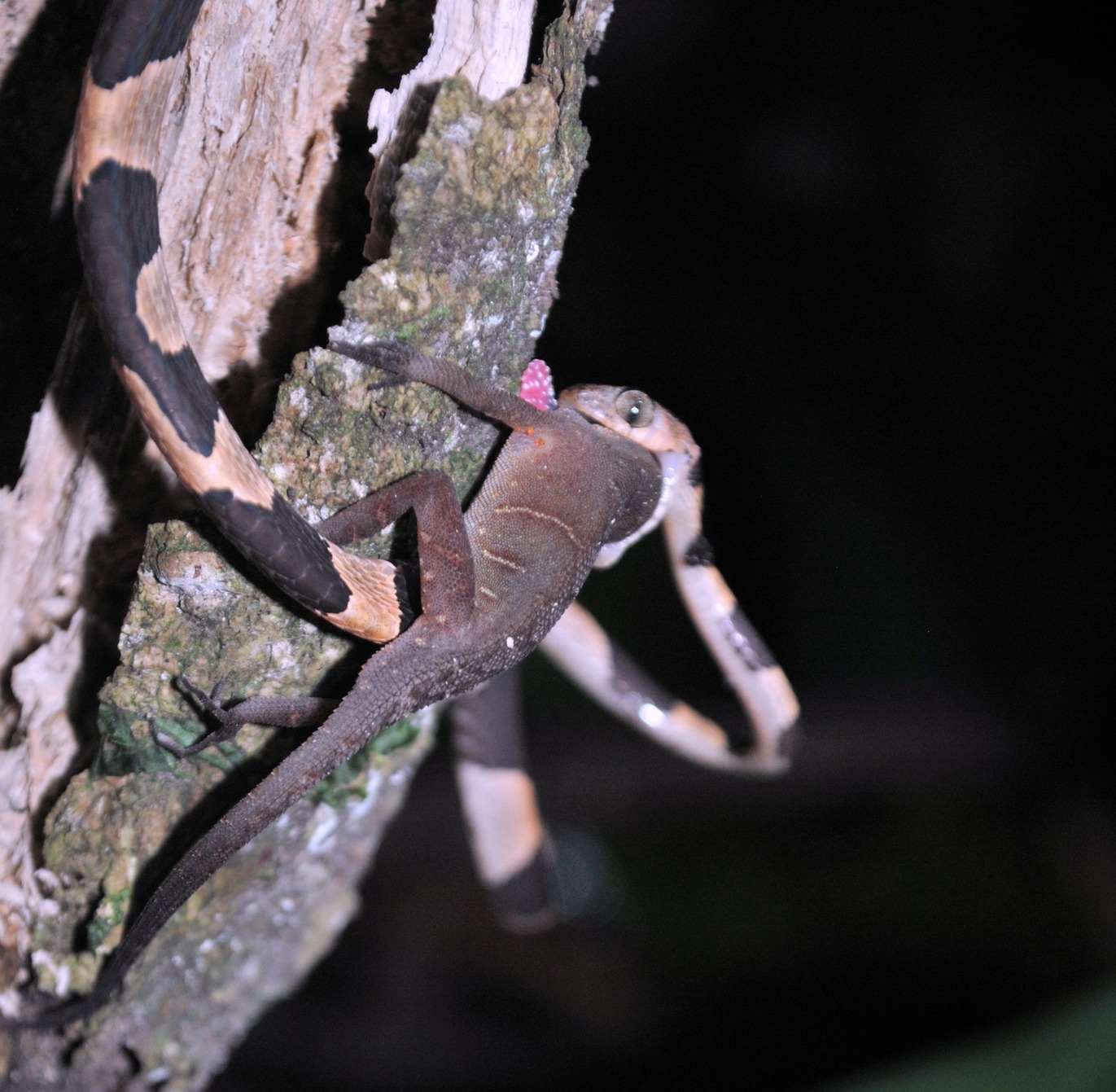
Eating a lesser scaly anole

== Diet ==
The blunthead tree snake is carnivorous and forages primarily at night. It preys mostly on small lizards (primarily anoles, such as Anolis capito, A. fuscoauratus, A. latifrons, A. limifrons, A. maculiventris, A. mariarum, A. ortonii, A. punctatus, A. trachyderma, and A. tropidogaster, but also others in the genera Basiliscus, Enyalioides, and Gonatodes), frogs (such as Craugastor crassidigitus and C. raniformis), and reptile and amphibian (such as Agalychnis callidryas) eggs. Because the female blunthead tree snakes tend to have larger heads, they are capable of preying on larger reptiles and amphibians. Imantodes cenchoa is rear-fanged and mildly venomous, but is not considered dangerous to humans.
