= Anolis pseudokemptoni =

Scientific classification
- Kingdom: Animalia
- Phylum: Chordata
- Class: Reptilia
- Order: Squamata
- Suborder: Iguania
- Family: Anolidae
- Genus: Anolis
- Species: A. pseudokemptoni

Binomial name
- Anolis pseudokemptoni Köhler, Ponce, Sunyer, & Batista, 2007

Species of lizard

Anolis pseudokemptoni is a species of lizard in the family Dactyloidae. It is a moderately-sized anole, growing to a maximum snout–vent length of 55 mm (2.2 in). It has a slender body and short legs. Both males and females have dewlaps. Males have larger tricolored red, orange, and tan-brown dewlaps, while females have smaller dewlaps that are most often yellow, but that can range from white to orange in color. The body is golden-yellow to brown above and dirty-white below. The anole is endemic to an extremely small portion of the central Serranía de Tabasará mountain range in the Ngäbe-Buglé Comarca of Panama. It is found at elevations of 1,130–2,010 m (3,710–6,590 ft). It has been suggested that it be classified as being critically endangered on the basis of its extremely small range and ongoing deforestation in the Serranía de Tabasará.

== Taxonomy ==
Anolis pseudokemptoni was formally described in 2007 based on an adult male specimen collected from the La Nevera trail in the Serranía de Tabasará mountain range in Panama. The species is named after its resemblance and presumed taxonomic closeness to Anolis kemptoni. The anole is part of the A. auratus species group. The large genus Anolis is sometimes split into multiple smaller genera, in which case A. pseudokemptoni is placed in the genus Norops.

== Description ==
Anolis pseudokemptoni is a moderately-sized anole for its genus, growing to a maximum snout–vent length of 55 mm (2.2 in). It has a slender body and short legs. Both males and females have dewlaps, although differing in appearance. Males have a tricolor dewlaps, wine-colored towards the back, orange towards the front, and with a small tan-brown portion at the upper-front corner. Females have smaller dewlaps that can vary from nearly white in color to orange, with the majority of females having a yellowish color. The back is golden-yellow to brown, with an indistinct brownish vertebral stripe. The underside of the body is dirty-white with brownish spots. The cloaca and foot of the tail are olive-yellow, while the tail itself can have strongly contrasting gray-and-brown rings. The iris is cinnamon-brown. Males can best be distinguished from similar-looking species that occur nearby by their red dewlaps and two-lobed hemipenises.

== Distribution and habitat ==
Anolis pseudokemptoni is endemic to an extremely small portion of the Panamanian Cordillera Central that marks the continental divide between the Americas. It was initially described from the mountain of Cerro Santiago in the central Serranía de Tabasará mountain range of the Ngäbe-Buglé Comarca. Subsequent surveys have only moderately increased its known range by several kilometers, to the nearby Cerro Sagui. Its current range is estimated to be only 32.35 km^{2} over a distance of 13 km as the crow flies. The species is found at elevations of 1,130–2,010 m (3,710–6,590 ft) in the Serranía de Tabasará, with its elevational range differing on the two slopes. It occurs down to 1,130 m (3,710 ft) on the Caribbean-facing slope and 1,390 m (4,560 ft) on the continental divide itself, but only occurs as low as 1,560 m (5,120 ft) on the Pacific-facing slope, where it is replaced at lower elevations by A. gruuo. It inhabits a variety of habitats in its small range, including near-untouched montane rainforest, cloud forests, secondary growth, riverbanks, agricultural plantations, and roads. The species is frequently encountered sleeping on vegetation a few meters high.

== Conservation ==
It has been suggested that Anolis pseudokemptoni be classified as being critically endangered on the basis of its extremely small range and ongoing deforestation in the Serranía de Tabasará, which is not formally protected.
