= Jacksonville Zoo and Gardens =

Zoo in Jacksonville, Florida, United States

Jacksonville Zoo and Botanical Gardens
- Interactive map of Jacksonville Zoo and Botanical Gardens
- Date opened: May 12, 1914
- Location: 370 Zoo Parkway, Jacksonville, Florida, 32218, United States
- Land area: 122 acres (49 ha)
- No. of animals: 2,000
- Annual visitors: 1+ million
- Memberships: AZA
- Website: JacksonvilleZoo.org

The Jacksonville Zoo and Botanical Gardens is located at the mouth of the Trout River, near where it flows into the St. Johns River, in Jacksonville, Florida. The zoo occupies approximately 122 acres (49 ha) and has over 2,000 animals and 1,000 plant species in its collection. The zoo has grown from a small collection in Springfield into one of the city's premier attractions, with more than one million visits annually.

The Jacksonville Zoo and Botanical Gardens' marquee attractions are the Range of the Jaguar, which won the 2005 AZA Exhibit of the year award and the Land of the Tiger, which opened in 2014 and features an innovative walk-through trail system for the zoo's tigers. The zoo's other exhibits include the Plains of East Africa, highlighting African savanna animals; Lorikeet Landing; Primate Forest, featuring two of the four genera of great apes, as well as several species of lemurs; and Wild Florida, which features animals native to the state.

The zoo is active in animal conservation, participating in more than 50 national and international conservation initiatives and more than 95 Species Survival Plans. In 2004, the zoo reached an agreement with the nation of Guyana to help promote conservation in that country, particularly the Iwokrama Forest. Additionally, since 1999 the zoo has been home to a large breeding colony of wild wood storks. Though not endangered, this bird is a rare find on the North American continent, and has, in this case, taken up permanent residence in a tree overlooking the Plains of Africa.

== History ==
The Municipal Zoo opened in the Springfield neighborhood of Jacksonville, Florida, on May 12, 1914. The first animal on exhibit was a red deer fawn. On July 19, 1925, the zoo moved to a 37.5-acre (152,000 m^{2}) site on the Trout River off Heckscher Drive in the city's Northside area.

Perhaps the most significant animal in the zoo's history was a jaguar named Zorro. Zorro was a male, wild-born black (melanistic) jaguar that arrived at the zoo in August 1967. At that time, black jaguars were very rare in captivity. During Zorro's 19 years at the zoo (he died in September, 1986), he fathered numerous cubs that were sent to other zoos across North America. In the spring of 2003, the Jax Zoo investigated and could not find a current North American captive-born black jaguar that was not a descendant of Zorro.

By the end of the 1960s, the zoo was reputed to have the largest collection of exotic animals in the Southeast, but it had fallen on hard times, and a great deal of money was needed to save the zoo. Community leaders, under the direction of Mayor Hans Tanzler, appointed a seven-member committee to search for an alternative to closing the zoo.

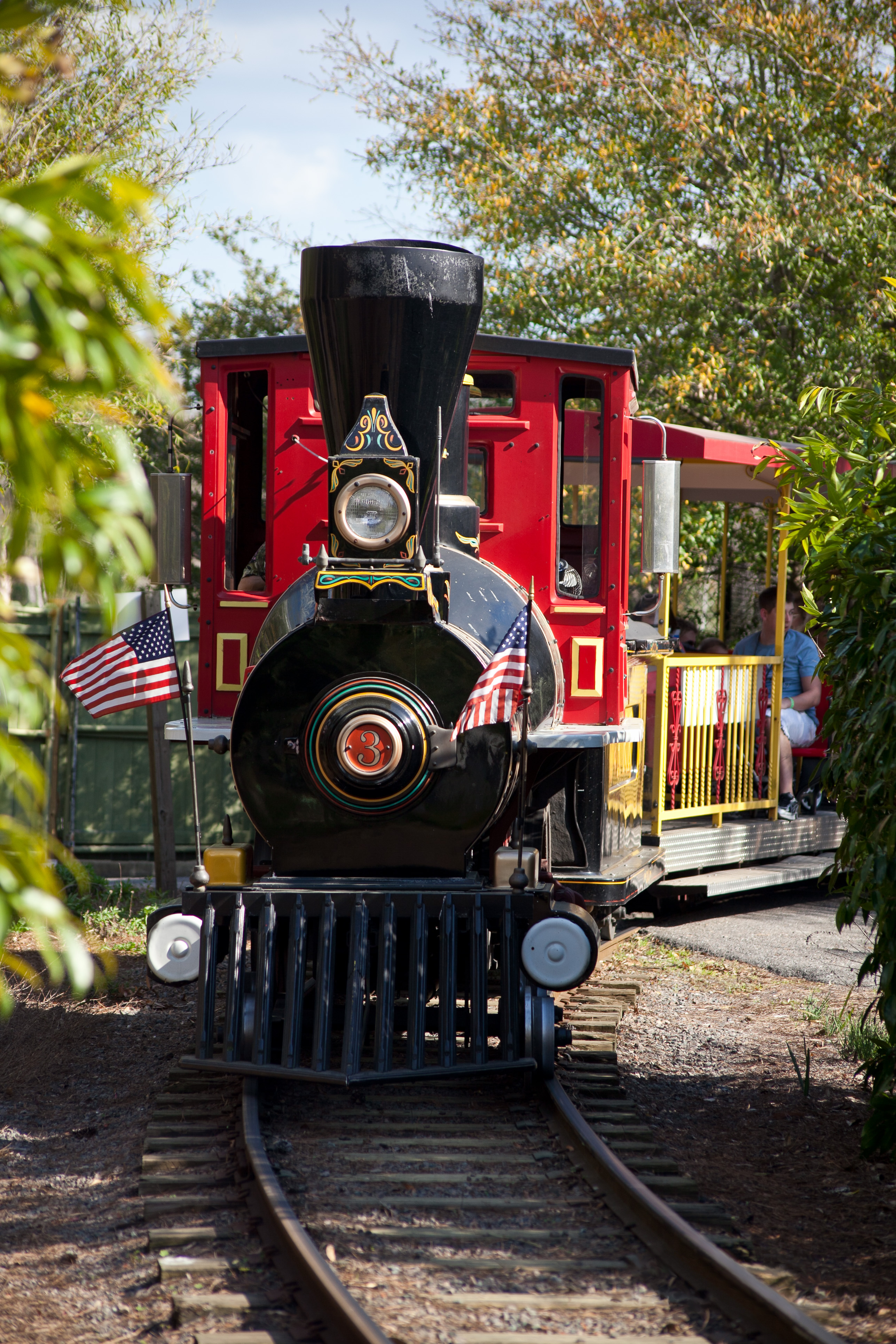
Small train at the zoo

A major redevelopment of the zoo began in 1992. Through a combination of public funds and private donations, over $20 million was raised. Projects that were completed in that timeframe include Main Camp (a new front entrance), a modernized parking lot, Birds of the Rift Valley (aviary), Great Apes of the World (now Primate Forest), an expanded train route, a new elephant enclosure, the RiverBranch Foundation Animal Medical Center, the PepsiCo Foundation Education Campus, and the redevelopment of the 11-acre (45,000 m^{2}) Plains of East Africa.

In December 2003, the zoo's name was officially changed from the Jacksonville Zoological Gardens to the Jacksonville Zoo and Gardens. Over the next five years, several new exhibits and services, including the famed Range of the Jaguar, the Savanna Blooms botanical garden, and the Children's Play Park successfully opened to the public. In addition, the zoo has endeavored to become recognized as a botanical garden.

On May 19, 2025, the zoo would change its name again under the (current) name Jacksonville Zoo and Botanical Gardens; with the botanical part helping to emphasize their collection of over 1,000 species of plants.

Currently, the zoo sits on 122 acres of land, over twice its original size on the Trout River location. The zoo houses over 2,000 rare and exotic animals and over 1,000 unique plant species and participates in many preservation and breeding programs to ensure the survival of endangered and threatened species as well as local fauna and flora. As part of their ReZoovenation plans, the zoo is planning to build a new main entrance and expand their "Manatee Critical Care Center (MCCC)."

== Management and finances ==
The Jacksonville Zoological Society began managing the zoo on June 21, 1971. Originally consisting of only the seven members appointed by Mayor Tanzler, the society now consists of 85 of the city's most influential leaders. There are currently thirty Board of Trustees members, with sixteen honorary members. The board conducts business regarding the zoo in the name of the society.

The City of Jacksonville contracts with the society to manage all phases of the operation of the zoo. All property, including land, animals and equipment, belong to the city; in turn, the city contributes an annual subsidy to offset some of the zoo's operating expenses. All other zoo expenses are paid through revenues earned from admissions, concession sales, memberships, the Animal Care Club program, the Annual Fund, sponsorships, grants, and fundraising events.

== Current exhibits ==
=== Africa Loop ===
The northern parts of the zoo are dominated by a series of African-themed exhibits.

==== River Valley Aviary ====
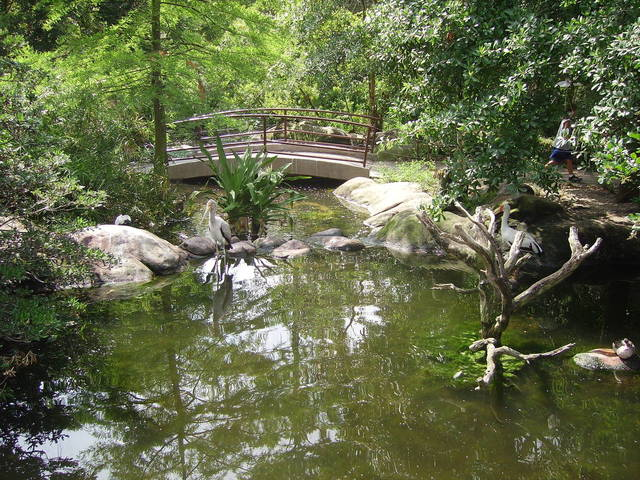
Storks wading in water at the River Valley Aviary

Opening as Birds of the Rift Valley in April 1996, the River Valley Aviary has over 9,000 square feet (800 m^{2}) for the birds to fly freely around visitors and a large waterfall at one end of the exhibit. As of 2026, this walkthrough aviary features ibises, waterfowl, storks and other African birds.

In late 2008, the zoo attempted to add Asian animals into the aviary, which included a muntjac and a Victoria crowned pigeon (this was later discontinued). For a time, a breeding pair of saddle-billed storks once lived within the aviary. As a result, the zoo was then the sixth in the US to successfully breed this species.

Exiting out of the main aviary, directly adjacent is the Ruzizi Streambank, which consists of two side aviaries for smaller birds, including the endangered Northern Bald Ibis.

==== Plains of East Africa ====
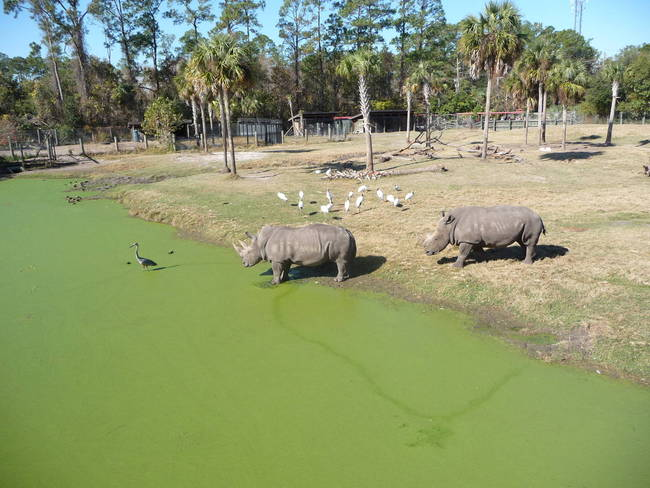
Two white rhinoceros heading into the water

The first major exhibit that guests experience from the main entrance. The following is primarily viewed from an elevated walkway, giving guests a bird's eye view of the animals. The attraction was first expanded upon in 1996, with frequent refurbishments being made in the years since.

Flamingos, giant tortoises, and warthogs are among the first animals that guests encounter when they enter the complex; with the first of two stations for the zoo’s train being a key focal point.

The zoo's breeding herd of bongos are found in a centralized pen that is spacious and tree-shaded. Every year, this exhibit has become a nesting hub for a large breeding colony of the threatened wood storks, which are native to Florida.

A nearby exhibit for lappet-faced vultures (which once held cheetahs) is a 300-foot (91 m) long, 50-foot (15 m) wide area that displays a pair of vultures. It lies across a water break from a larger mixed-exhibit containing white rhinoceroses, kudu, and crowned cranes together, which inhabit the areas at the end of the boardwalk. This 2.5-acre (10,000 m^{2}) exhibit allows plenty of room for the animals to roam. The zoo has been a successful breeder of southern white rhinos, with over a dozen successful births.

==== Elephant Plaza ====
Lionesss grooming a cub in an exhibit. (Video)

This offers an intimate view of the zoo's three African bush elephants in their 275,000-gallon pool. This zoo is one of the few North American zoos to house both male and female elephants. The bull elephant, Ali, was donated by Michael Jackson in 1997. The other two, Thandi and Sheena, are females. Sheena arrived from the Catskill Game Farm on October 3, 1985. While Thandi arrived from The National Elephant Center on November 13, 2015.

In addition to the area's namesake, Elephant Plaza is also home to Reptiles of the Seronera, a reptile house that first opened in 1998, and highlights a diverse collection of African reptiles.

Further down the boardwalk is Mahali Pa Simba ("Place of the Lion" in Swahili), the 1-acre (4,000 m2) home of the zoo's male lion, Michael, and female, Sriracha. Like most of the zoo’s exhibits, Mahali Pa Simba has constantly changed over the years; with the largest change being the addition of a third viewing area on the exhibit’s north side.

For a time, Amur leopards were displayed along the southern end of the boardwalk. Historically, the zoo successfully bred this rare subspecies in 2010. with the zoo's last leopard, Nicolai, dying in November 2020. After Nicolai’s death, their habitat temporarily held yellow-billed storks, African spoonbills, northern bald ibises and southern screamers before the original structure came down for good in 2024.

=== Primate Forest ===
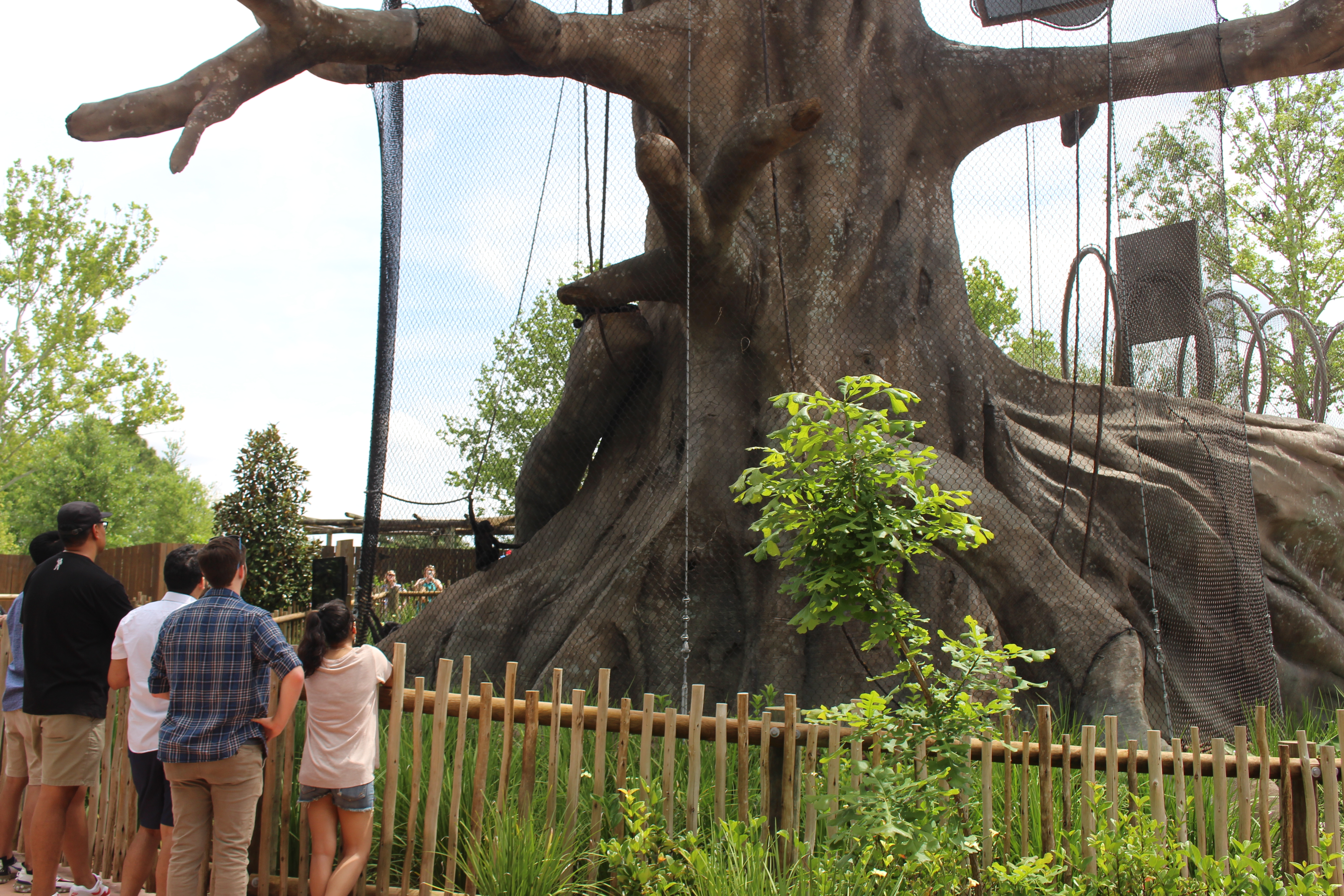
Bonobos can be seen at this part of the exhibit.

Primate Forest gives zoo visitors a look at the various primates that inhabit our planet. The exhibit opened as the Great Apes of the World, which itself opened in two phases in 1998 and 1999, respectively, at a cost of $20 million. Phase I included western lowland gorillas and bonobos, the first time the zoo had exhibited either species. The zoo's collection of bonobos is one of only nine in North America. The exhibit provided also homes for the zoo's siamangs and pygmy marmosets. Phase II included a second gorilla yard, along with new exhibits for the zoo's chimpanzees and mandrills, along with renovating an old monkey island to an exhibit for lemurs.

Since its opening, the attraction has received several changes over the years. In 2004, the pygmy marmosets were relocated to the nearby Range of the Jaguar exhibit, while the chimpanzees were sent to another zoo in 2007. In 2018, the exhibit experienced a significant renovation and was rebranded under the name "African Forest" to reflect the newer changes. In 2024, a minor rebranding occurred, with the changes revolving around the current name "Primate Forest", which puts a stronger emphasis on primates in general.

==== Giraffe Overlook ====
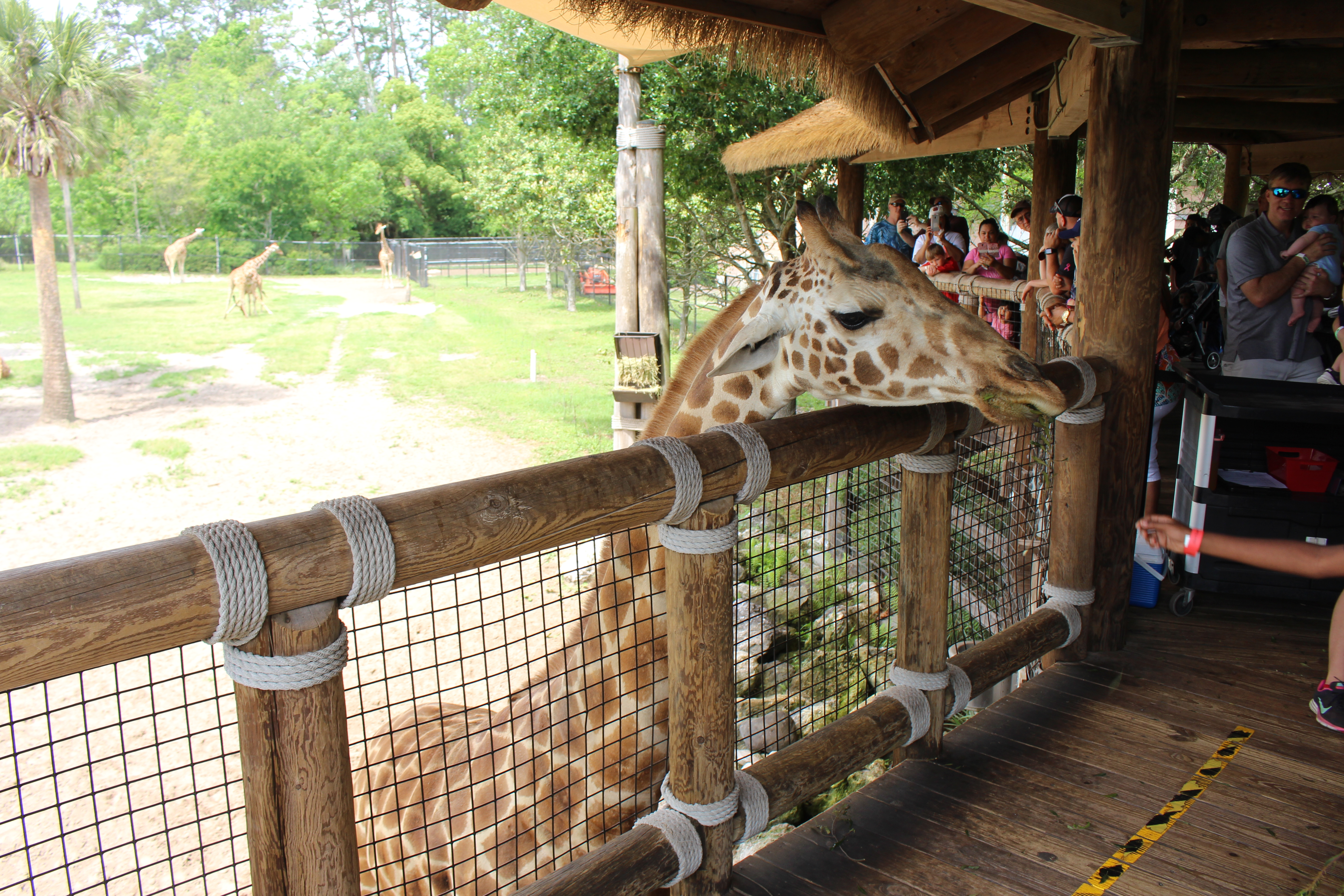
Part of the viewing platform for the Giraffe Overlook exhibit.

The covered boardwalk gives guests a view across a replica of the African Savanna, and guests can also get eye-to-eye with the zoo's giraffe tower, where the zoo sells giraffe food. The initial renovation more than doubled the original exhibit from 3/4 of an acre to around 2.5 acres (10,000 m^{2}).

The zoo's giraffe tower currently includes seven giraffes. AJ, who arrived from the El Paso Zoo in 2020, is their only adult male; while the rest are females Rosie, Luna, Naomi, Faraja, Figie, and Willow.

=== Wild Florida & Manatee River ===
Since 2026, this section has served as the gateway from the main entrance to the rest of the zoo, following the March 6th opening of the nearby Manatee River. Built on the site of the old Florida Wetlands exhibit, this attraction highlights animals native to the state, as well as some that have been extirpated. In 2007, the former American flamingo exhibit was renovated to accommodate the eagles, so that their exhibit could be used for a pair of whooping cranes the zoo acquired.

Reptiles of Florida, the exhibit's dedicated reptile house, shows off a variety of reptiles and amphibians native (and invasive) to the state, with rattlesnakes, cottonmouths, and indigo snakes being some of the most notable species displayed.

This attraction is also home to the (current) Manatee Critical Care Center (MCCC), a manatee rehabilitation center which was one of only four of its kind at the time it first opened in 2017. In 2026, the zoo’s rehabilitation efforts were expanded with the opening of Manatee River, which features a new 330,000 gallon habitat to care for rescued manatees.

=== Range of the Jaguar ===
Range of the Jaguar exhibit

In the spring of 2004, Range of the Jaguar opened to the general public. This Central and South American-themed attraction, the zoo’s largest at the time it opened, includes a diverse variety of species from the jaguar’s natural habitat of the Americas.

To the benefit of the attraction’s development, the money that went into the funding of this expansion came largely from the [then] Mayor John Delaney (Florida politician)’s Better Jacksonville Plan referendum, which passed in September 2000.

Following its opening year, the attraction won the 2005 AZA exhibit of the year award. Nowadays, the exhibit is most notable for featuring one of the largest jaguar habitats in North America, which includes a large pool complete with underwater viewing. Currently, two jaguars call the Jacksonville Zoo home; a male named Harry (born at the zoo in 2009), and a female named Babette.

Both jaguars are the parents of Banks, a male cub that was born at the zoo on April 7, 2023, before moving to the Cameron Park Zoo in February 2025. Prior to Banks’ birth, the zoo’s previous jaguar cub, a male named Khan (named for the Jacksonville Jaguars owner Shad Khan) was then their latest attempt at breeding these big cats. Khan was born on July 18, 2013, to parents Zassi and Tuco (both parents have since died), and now lives at the Brevard Zoo.

Adjacent to the jaguars, the indoor Lost Temple provides an air-conditioned setting to view the wide diversity of life from the Neotropics, which includes an assortment of reptiles and amphibians native to that part of the world. Heading outdoors from the temple, the nearby River’s Edge highlights a mixed-species setting featuring giant anteaters and various primates. Rounding out the exhibits in this complex, the Emerald Forest Aviary (a 7,700 sq ft. walkthrough exhibit) allows visitors to walk beside a multitude of Neotropical fauna. Alongside the over 100 free-flying birds, this is where the zoo’s giant otters are housed, which are kept in a separate enclosure away from the birds. Outside of the aviary’s exit, a separate habitat dedicated to the zoo’s charismatic American flamingos serves as a transition between here and the nearby Trout River Plaza.

=== Lorikeet Landing ===
Opening in March 2002 as the Outback Steakhouse's Australian Adventure, it was the first new exhibit to open at the south end of the zoo in seven years (at the time of its opening). As of 2025, the attraction is no longer sponsored by Outback. In 2024, the attraction was rebranded under the current name Lorikeet Landing. The most notable animals of this attraction include an emu, a cassowary, and two species of lories and lorikeets. Included with a total experience ticket, guests are given popsicle sticks covered with a powdered nectar that is used to feed the lorikeets.

Koalas were once part of the exhibit from its opening until December 2006. The koalas were then sent back to the San Diego Zoo as per the terms of their lease. Shortly thereafter, the former koala house became the (current) Amphibian Conservation Center, which opened on February 15, 2007.

=== Play Park ===
Directly across the main pathway from Range of the Jaguar. The initial phase of the zoo’s 2.5-acre (10,000 m^{2}) Play Park first opened in May 2006, which replaced the outdated Okavango Village, which had been demolished a year prior. As of 2025, this family-oriented attraction includes a splash park (open seasonally), a jungle-gym inspired-playground, and a children’s hedge maze. Neighboring the goats and splash park is the Discovery Center, which is the zoo’s central hub for education programs. The Play Park may have the smallest number of animals displayed in one area but makes up for it with charismatic species popular with families. The first animals are the zoo’s pygmy goats, which guests can pet and interact with while sharing the same space.

Nearby is the Tuxedo Coast, an exhibit for magellanic penguins that opened in April 2010, replacing the river otters that were once displayed there. Additionally, underwater viewing for the penguins is available for guests to watch the flightless birds splash and swim up and along their shallow pool.

On March 8, 2025, Sloth Crossing, an exhibit dedicated to the two-toed sloth opened to the public. Replacing the Play Park’s troop of squirrel monkeys (which were relocated to the nearby Range of the Jaguar) the following is a reimagined exhibit that is segmented into two areas: one outdoor, and one indoors. In addition, an up-close sloth encounter that takes place behind the scenes is available for guests looking for an unforgettable experience with the zoo’s sloths.

=== Stingray Bay ===
Stingray Bay opened on March 1, 2008, and features several species of rays housed in a 17,000-gallon, 30-by-40-foot (12 m) saltwater pool, guests can touch and feed cownose rays, southern stingrays, and Atlantic stingrays. The exhibit replaced the former Camel Rides in the same location near the Great Plains of East Africa. In 2011, the zoo took its operation over fully from an outside contractor, allowing the exhibit to stay open year-round. There is an additional fee to enter this exhibit.

=== Asian Bamboo Gardens ===
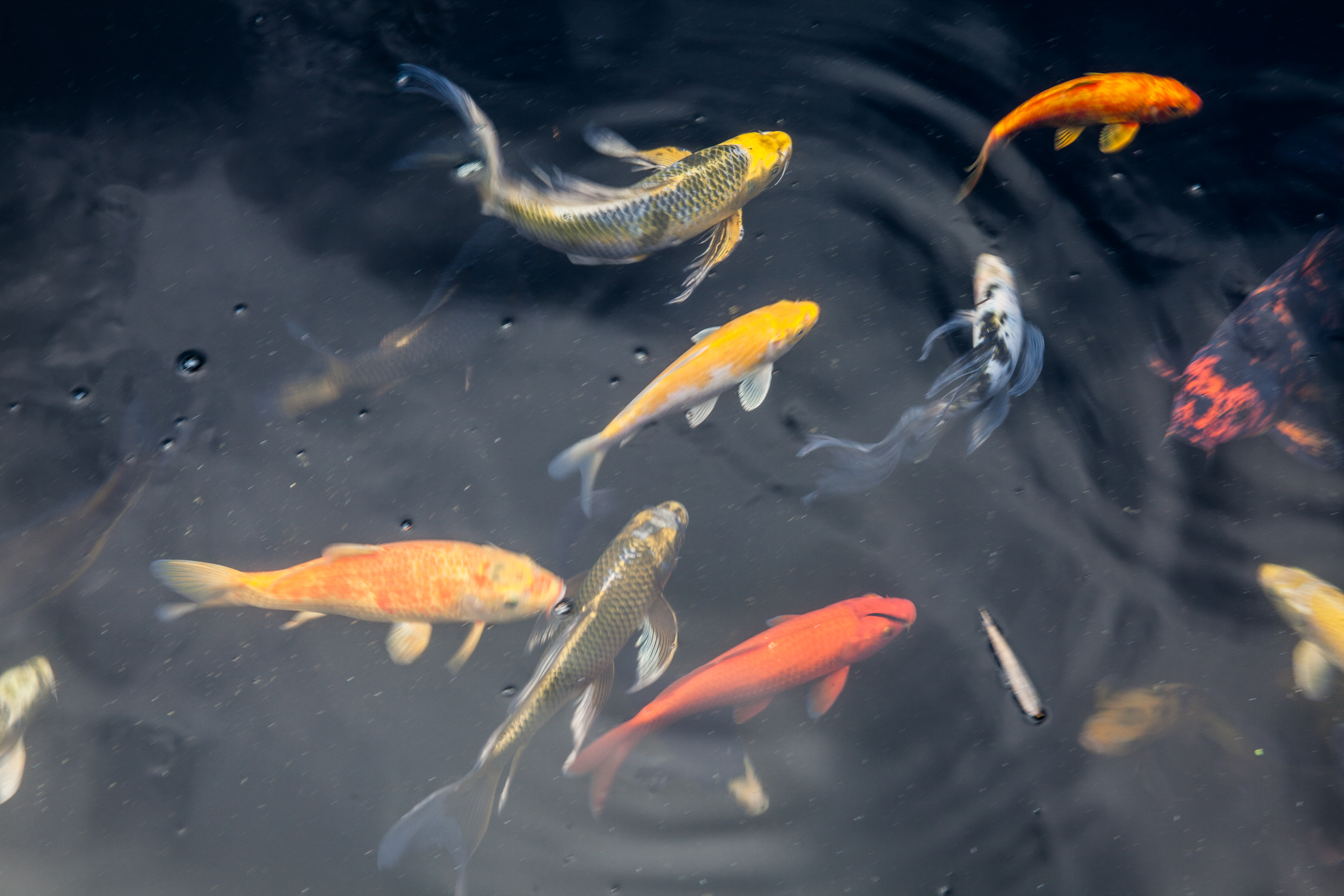
Up close view of koi in a pond in the gardens.

Predating the Land of the Tiger by six years, the beautiful Asian Bamboo Gardens opened in March 2009. It features plantings and design elements drawn from throughout Asia, and is not intended to represent a specific country or culture. To enter the gardens is from the adjacent Trout River Plaza through a traditional circular moon gate. A large lotus pond for koi incorporates rock and water features intended to evoke the Chinese principles of yin and yang. Elsewhere, an Orchid Pavilion patterned after a Japanese tea house overlooks the pond. The garden also features a Moon Bridge, reflecting the shape of the Moon in the water of the lotus pool, and a nearby bamboo grove contains a bronze sculpture depicting a family of giant pandas.

Serving as a transition between the main garden and Land of the Tiger, a separate enclosure for Komodo Dragons opened with the former in 2009. Intentionally, the exhibit is designed to appear as if the dragons are wandering amongst the backyards of a rural Indonesian fishing village on the island of Komodo.

=== Land of the Tiger ===
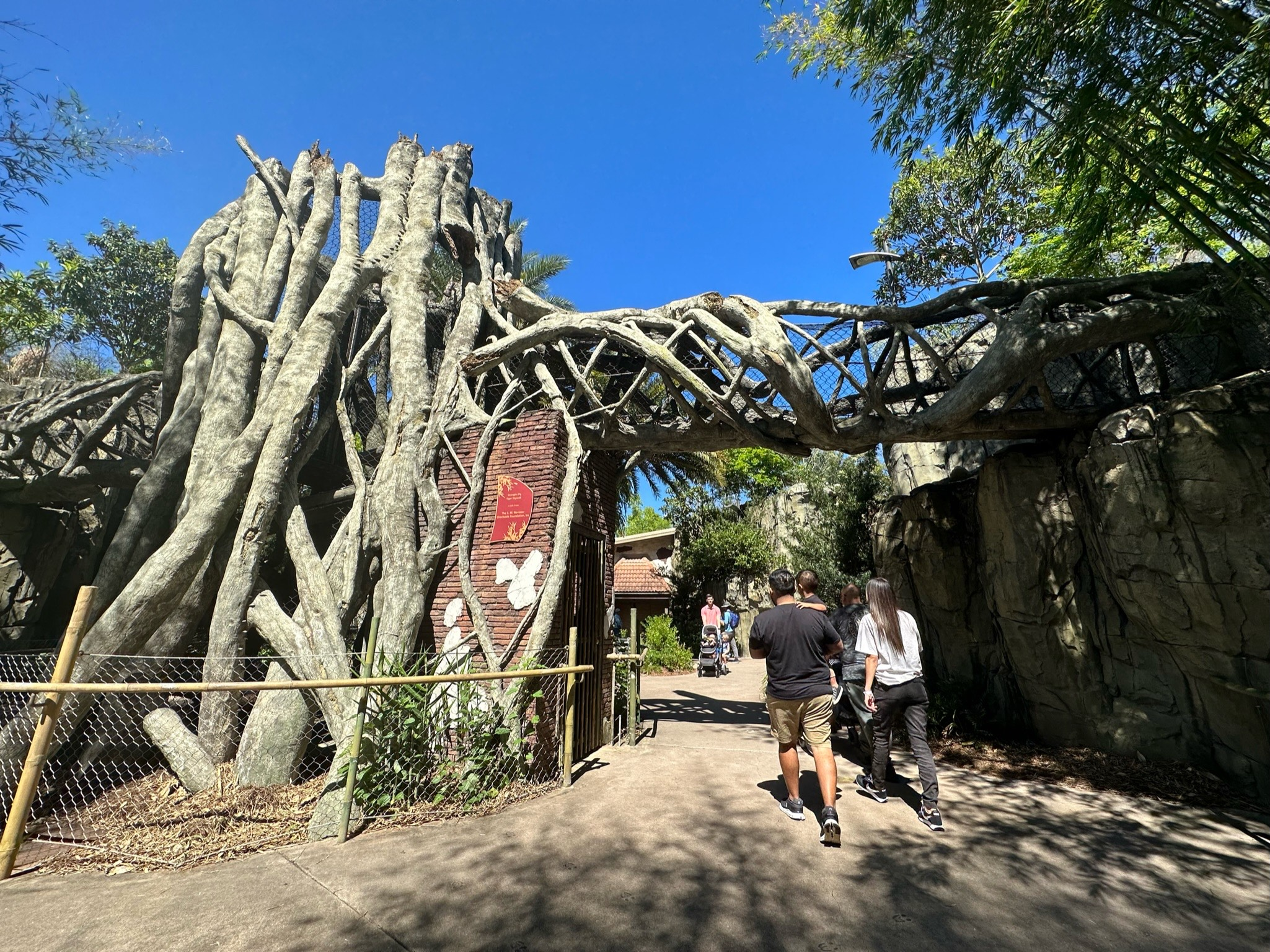
Walkway through the Land of the Tiger.

In 2014, the zoo opened the Land of the Tiger. As guests enter the main attraction, connected aviaries for two species of hornbill can be seen. Just beyond the birds, a large enclosure nearby displays Visayan warty pigs, while small-clawed otters and babirusas share another exhibit, complete with multiple viewing areas.

Currently, the zoo maintains three Malayan tigers, which consists of father Bashir (who came from Zoo Knoxville), mother Cinta (who came from Busch Gardens Tampa), and their adolescent daughter, Mina (born at the zoo on November 5, 2023). In addition to Mina, Bashir and Cinta were also the parents of Machli and Beppy, who are Mina's siblings. Once the cubs reached maturity, Machli and Beppy departed the zoo for other facilities as part of the species survival plan (SSP) for Malayan tigers.

Usually, the tigers are provided access to a pair of state-of-the-art exhibits, which features a tunnel system that allows the large cats to choose where they would like to roam, while also granting the guests a unique opportunity to view the tigers from multiple vantage points.

== Animal conservation programs ==
=== Wood storks ===
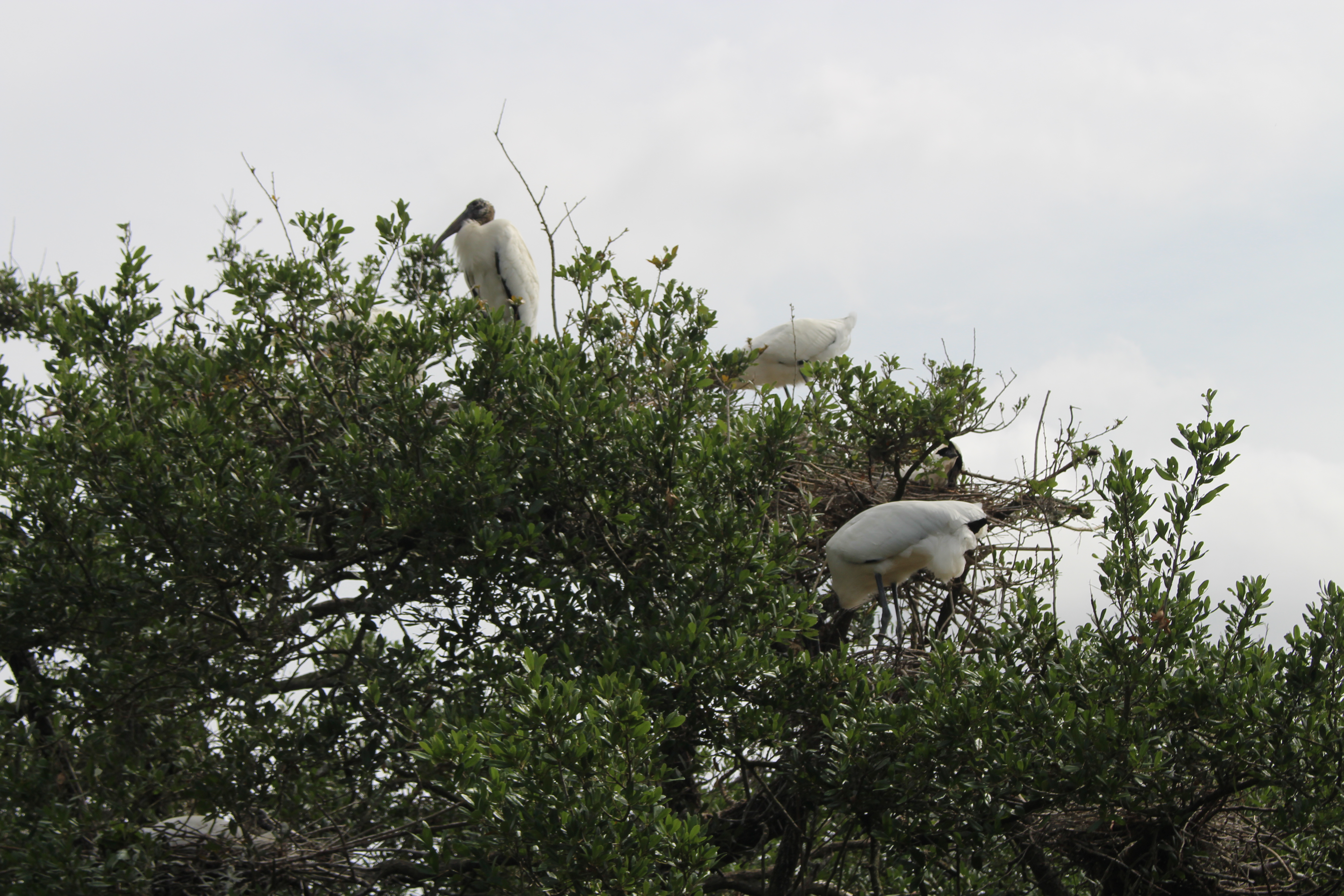
Wood stork (Mycteria americana) populations have increased through the colony at the zoo.

The antelope exhibit in the Plains of East Africa has become home to a large breeding colony of wood storks. The storks return every year because of the abundance of water and fish in the immediate area. The colony has grown from just 7 nesting pairs that produced no chicks in 1999 to 82 pairs that produced 219 chicks in 2005.

The zoo's colony has been deemed the most important established breeding colony of woodstorks in North Florida. At the end of the 2006 breeding season, several firsts occurred. It was the first year birds that were tagged as hatching at the zoo returned to breed, along with the first sighting of a bird tagged at another rookery. At the end of the 2006 season, it is estimated over 800 chicks have been successfully raised in the colony since 2000.

=== Iwokrama Forest and Guyana ===
With the opening of the Range of the Jaguar exhibit, the zoo also unveiled its project with the nation of Guyana and the Iwokrama Forest. Signs around the exhibit show what is being done to protect the animals shown in their native habitats. The partnership allows the zoo to receive animals that would be unable to be released back to the wild, such as with the 2006 addition of two jaguars which were household pets sent to the zoo from Guyana.

=== Species Survival Plan breeding programs ===
Animal group	Common name	Scientific name	Conservation program, significant achievements
Big cats			
	Jaguar	Panthera onca	SSP, largest jaguar exhibit in North America, 1 successful birth
	Transvaal lion	Panthera leo krugeri	SSP
	Florida panther	Puma concolor coryi	SSP
	Amur leopard	Panthera pardus orientalis	SSP, 2 successful birth
	South African cheetah	Acinonyx jubatus jubatus	SSP
Primates			
	Siamang	Hylobates syndactylus	SSP
	Bonobo	Pan paniscus	SSP, one of only zoos in North America to house species, 4 successful births
	Western lowland gorilla	Gorilla gorilla gorilla	SSP
	Mandrill	Mandrillus sphinx	SSP, 2 successful births since 2003
	Ring tailed, red ruffed, and black & white ruffed lemurs	Lemur catta, Varecia variegata rubra, Varecia variegata variegata	SSP
	Colobus monkey	Colobus guereza	SSP
Large mammals			
	African elephant	Loxodonta africana	SSP, one of few zoos to house male elephant
	Southern white rhino	Ceratotherium simum simum	SSP, over a dozen successful births have occurred since 1980; one of a few zoos worldwide to produce 2nd generation white rhino calves
	Eastern bongo	Tragelaphus eurycerus isaaci	SSP, several bongos born at the zoo participated in repatriation on Mount Kenya, Kenya
	Okapi	Okapia johnstoni	Okapi Conservation Project working in the Okapi Wildlife Reserve in Democratic Republic of Congo
	Manatee	Paenungulata Sirenia	Marine Mammal Rescue Program - Manatee Critical Care Center
Other mammals			
	Red wolf	Canis rufus	SSP
Birds			
	Swallow-Tailed Kite	Elanoides forficatus	helped fund an aerial survey to identify breeding roosts and count birds in 2015 and 2016

== Botanical Gardens ==
=== Asian Bamboo Gardens ===
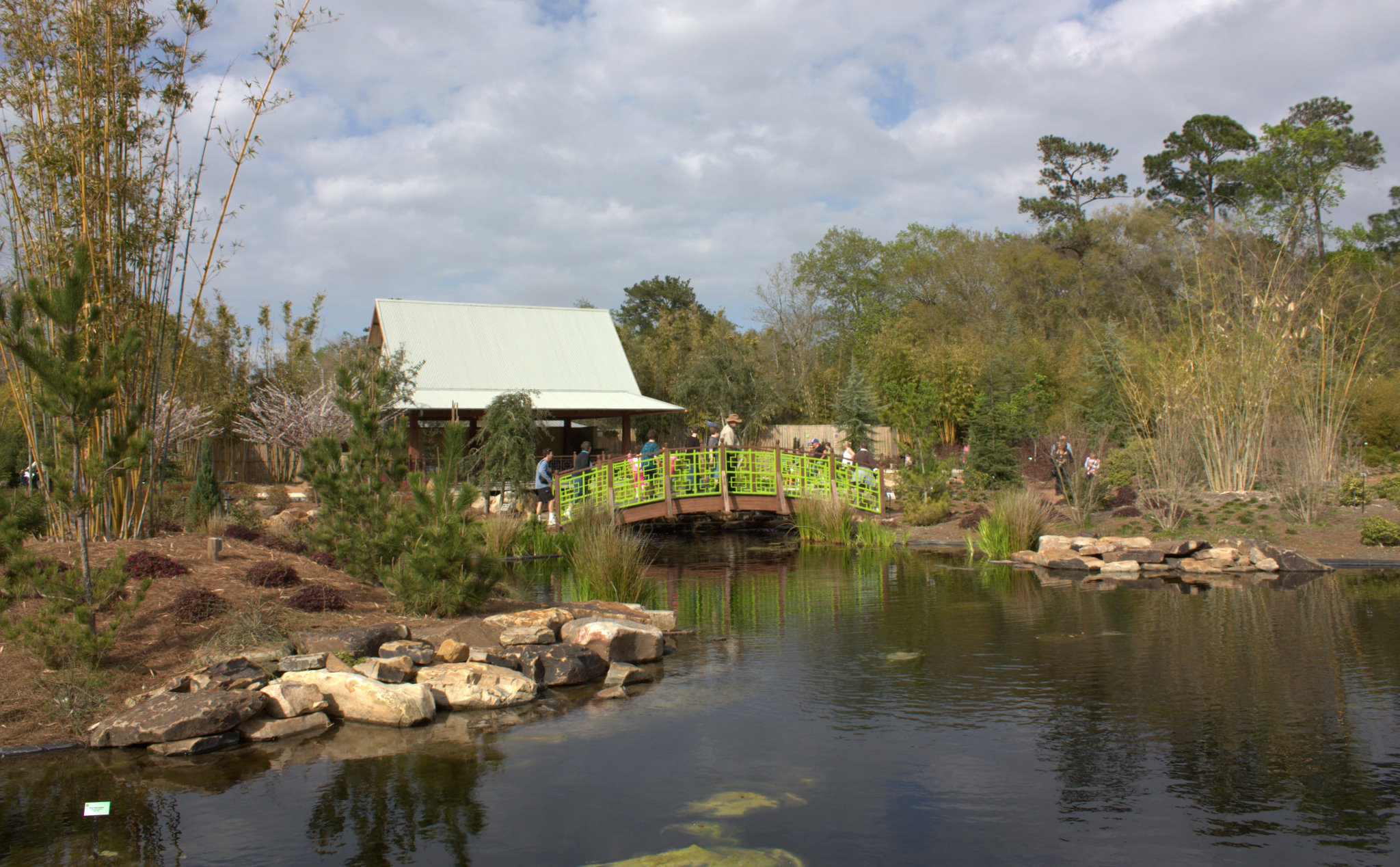
A view of the Asian Bamboo Gardens.

This garden serves as an introduction to the zoo’s Asian-themed exhibits. To better resonate with their broader culture, various plants from across Asia are found here. Some of the significant features of this garden include the Moon Gate, Lotus Pool, Weeping Tree Bridge, and the Orchid Pavilion.

=== Savanna Blooms ===
This first themed pocket garden was completed in spring 2005. Nestled beneath the Giraffe Overlook, visitors will find acacia groves that flank two entrances into the one-half acre garden. This garden, styled after a South African oasis, transitions from soft grasslands and fine textured acacia leaves at each entrance into a bold contemporary garden at its core. Kopje outcrops erupt from the landscape, and a weep trickles down the face of the rocks. The spring feeds a serene pool that showcases African water lilies and water edge plants. Visitors rest beneath the curved trellis laden with fragrant flowering vines and view the garden's splendor from an internal vantage point.

=== Gardens of Trout River Plaza ===
Between 2005 and 2007, the area encompassing the old Okavango Landing, as well as the children's play area was renovated. In September 2007, the $1.9 million Trout River Plaza botanical garden opened. The area - which also includes a grassy area named "The Lawn" which is used for special events - encompasses 1.6 acres (6,500 m^{2}). The heart of this addition is the 1/4 acre garden space, partially walled with a fountain with an anhinga sculpture, flower beds and a lot of hardscape. There are columns topped with flowering plants, benches for seating, and a large patio area surrounding the fountain. Seven live oaks and other native trees - red maples, magnolias, and forest pansies - have been planted in the area around the garden to provide shade.

== Services ==
=== Restaurants ===
The Main Camp Café snack bar offers quick refreshments near the park's entrance, as well as a Starbucks Café inside. As part of the Range of the Jaguar exhibit, the Palm Plaza Café offers a southwestern menu. They have a variety of vegetarian and gluten-free options, which can be eaten in their indoor and outdoor seating. The Sweet Shop is also located in Range of the Jaguar. At the back of the zoo, near the Gardens of Trout River Plaza exhibit and the former Trout River pier entrance, is the Trout River Grill. Next to Trout River Grill is where the Kona Ice Truck can be seen. Here people can cool off with some shaved ice in the hot Florida weather. Play Park Cafe is near the namesake Play Park.

Picnic grounds are located at the south end of the zoo's parking lot, near the Education Campus. No open fire or grills are allowed.

== Education ==
=== Family Early Childhood Education ===
Semester-long programs for children ages 1 to 5. Classes take place at the PepsiCo Foundation Education Campus located at the south end of the Zoo's main parking lot. You do not need to enter the Zoo in order to enter the education campus. Natures Newbies are 45-minute-long programs for children ages 1 to 3. Zoo Tots are 60 minutes lone and open to children ages 3 to 5.

=== Group Early Childhood Education ===
This program is offered both onsite and as an outreach for children ages Pre-K through Kindergarten.

=== Classroom Programs ===
Formal education programs at the PepsiCo Foundation Education Campus may be scheduled Monday through Friday, September through May at 9:30 a.m., 10:30 a.m., 11:30 a.m. or 12:30 p.m. Programs are available for Pre-K through 12th grade and have been developed in conjunction with the Next Generation Sunshine State and the Common Core Standards. Presentations focus on a grade-level appropriate subjects and may include up-close and hands-on animal encounters.

=== Field Trips ===
March, April & May are the busiest months for school visits. Nearly 50,000 or 50% of the zoo's annual field trip attendance occurs during these spring months. JZBG is a field trip destination for nearly 100,000 school students, teachers and chaperones every year from as far away as Columbia, SC & Savannah, GA, Orlando & Tallahassee, FL.

=== Homeschool Programs ===
Zoocademy is a unique experience for homeschool students ages 5–18, covering a range of topics in biology, zoology, environmental science, and conservation. This course ran from September 2016- March 2017.

Students ages 5–12 will meet at the Education Campus at the Jacksonville Zoo and Botanical Gardens once a month. Students ages 13–18 will attend class once every other month at the zoo's Education Campus. Enrollment is limited to home-schooled children ages 5–18. Children will be enrolled in the appropriate age class based on their age as of September 1, 2016. In accordance with Florida state law, children must be 5 years old on or before September 1 to enroll.

Due to COVID-19, new guidelines were in place to ensure the students' safety. First, masks were required for all students and staff while indoors. This also eliminated snack breaks to help prevent covid transmission. Class sizes were limited to 15 students, and parents signed a liability waiver before the students were admitted.

=== After Dark Adventures ===
The Education Department's After Dark Adventures are unique events that take participants behind the scenes to meet the exotic animal collection up-close. After Dark Adventures take place outside of regular zoo hours. These include special events and safari sleepovers.

=== Zoo Camps ===
Zoo Camps are held during school vacations. Camp programs include zoo tours, activities and games, crafts, and hands-on encounters with animals every day. Registration opens seasonally.

In addition to school vacations, some zoo camps are held around holidays and themed around those events.

=== Zoo to You Outreach ===
This outreach program is designed to serve various groups and venues from classrooms to large auditoriums and special events. The classroom program is available for up to 30 attendees, the auditorium program serves groups of 31 to 250, and events and festivals option is available for larger functions. Age-appropriate topics for classroom and auditorium programs are available.

=== Teacher and Educator Workshops ===
Teach workshops are available for classroom teachers, homeschooling parents, and museum or park service educators. The Zoo's Education Department Teacher & Educator Workshops are designed to help educators engage their students in environmental education. Topics vary and many can be counted towards continuing education requirements.

=== Scout Programs ===
The Education Department offers many opportunities for scouts to learn about the animal world. Programs range from 45-minute classroom programs to sleepovers at the Zoo in various exhibit areas. Programs may include live animals, biofacts, activities, games, tours, or crafts. The zoo also offers various programs that help scouts work towards their badge requirements.

=== Graduate Education ===
The Jacksonville Zoo and Botanical Gardens is a part of Miami University’s graduate-level Advanced Inquiry Program (AIP). The program offers a Master of Arts in Biology or Master of Arts in Teaching through online coursework and face-to-face experiential learning experiences at the zoo. AIP Master's students earn 35 credit hours by experiential learning at the Jacksonville Zoo and Botanical Gardens as well as core curriculum courses that occur on the web. Applications for the Advanced Inquiry Program open in September for the following year, with classes starting in May. Part of the preliminary process includes filling out a short interest form, which helps them gauge general interest in the program. The program is eligible for anyone who has a bachelor's degree, regardless of their major, and applicants must at least have a 2.75 GPA.

== Future plans ==
=== ReZoovenation ===
Beginning in 2021, the zoo first unveiled their ambitious $50 million redevelopment plan to completely revitalize (nearly) every part of the zoo.

Following the completion of the plan’s first phase (an overhaul of the zoo’s existing parking lot), the next phase included the 25,000 sq. ft VyStar (Credit Union) SkyScape and the addition of Manatee River, a new exhibit for manatees that was proposed as an expansion of the zoo’s preexisting Manatee Critical Care Center (MCCC), and is sponsored by J. Wayne and Delores Barr Weaver, who helped fund and name the new exhibit.

In 2023, the zoo held a groundbreaking ceremony related to the commencement of Phase 2’s construction (SkyScape; Manatee River). On March 6, 2026, both the SkyScape and Manatee River officially opened to the public.

== Gallery ==
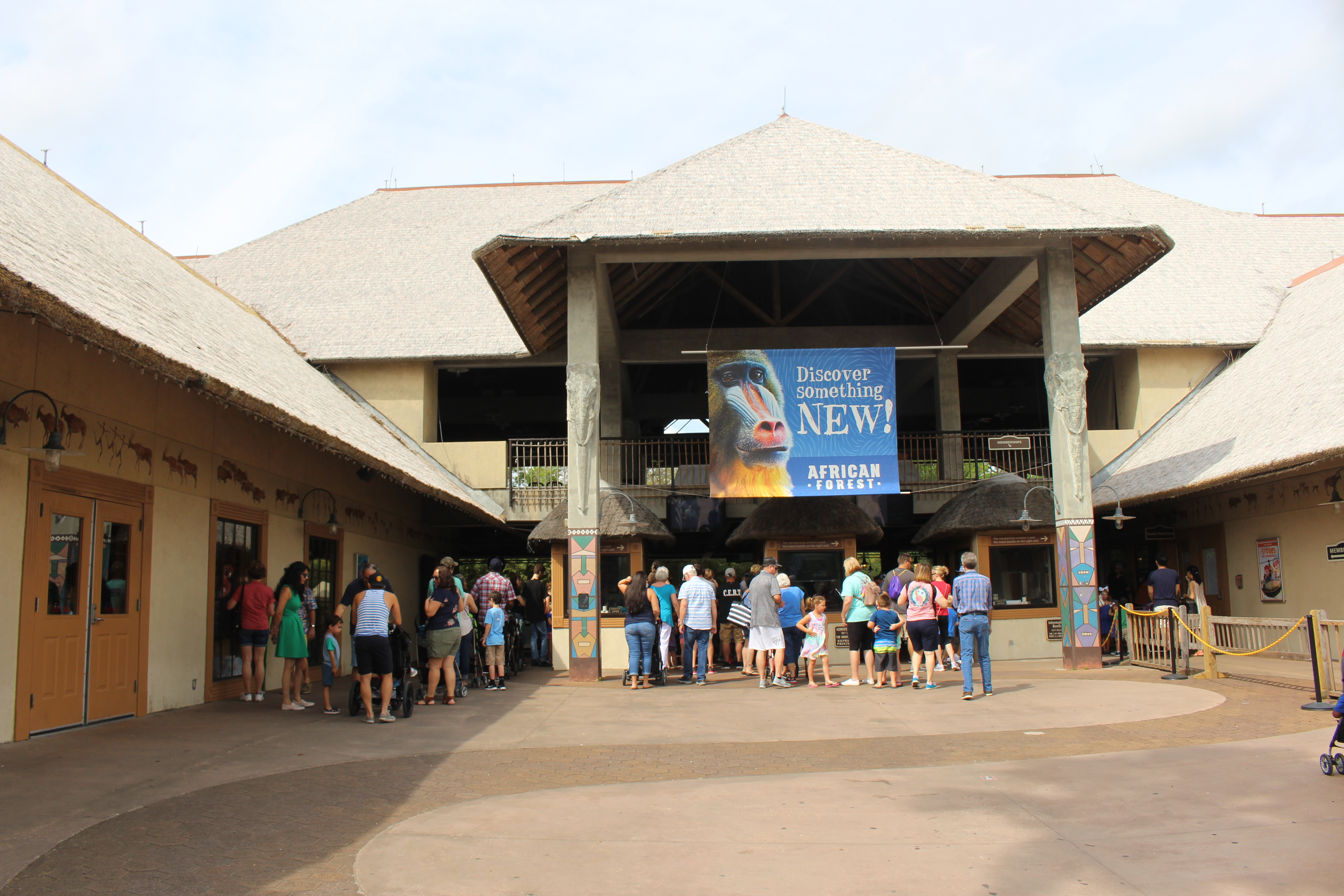
Main entrance

Bald eagle

Koala

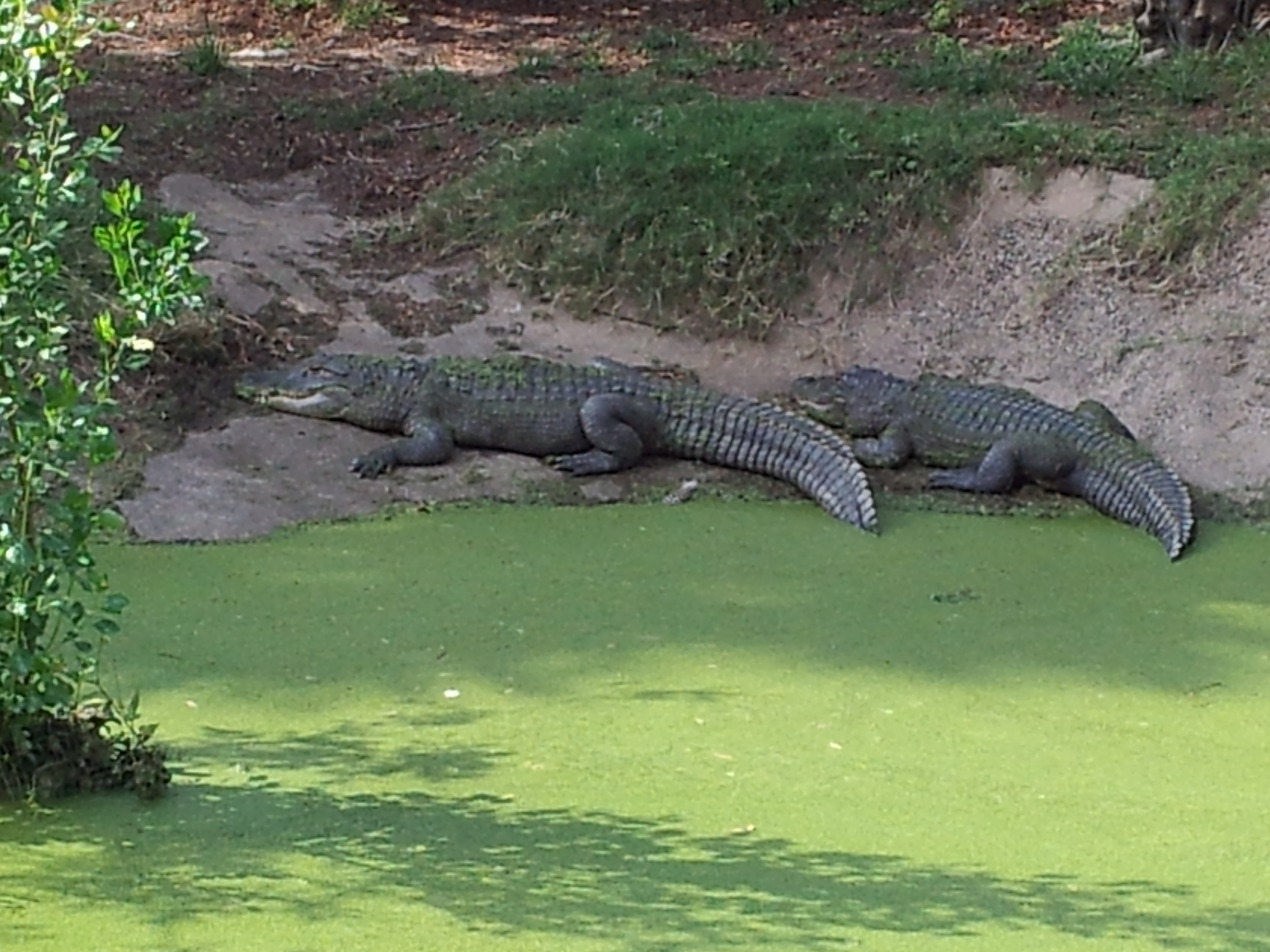
American alligators in an exhibit.

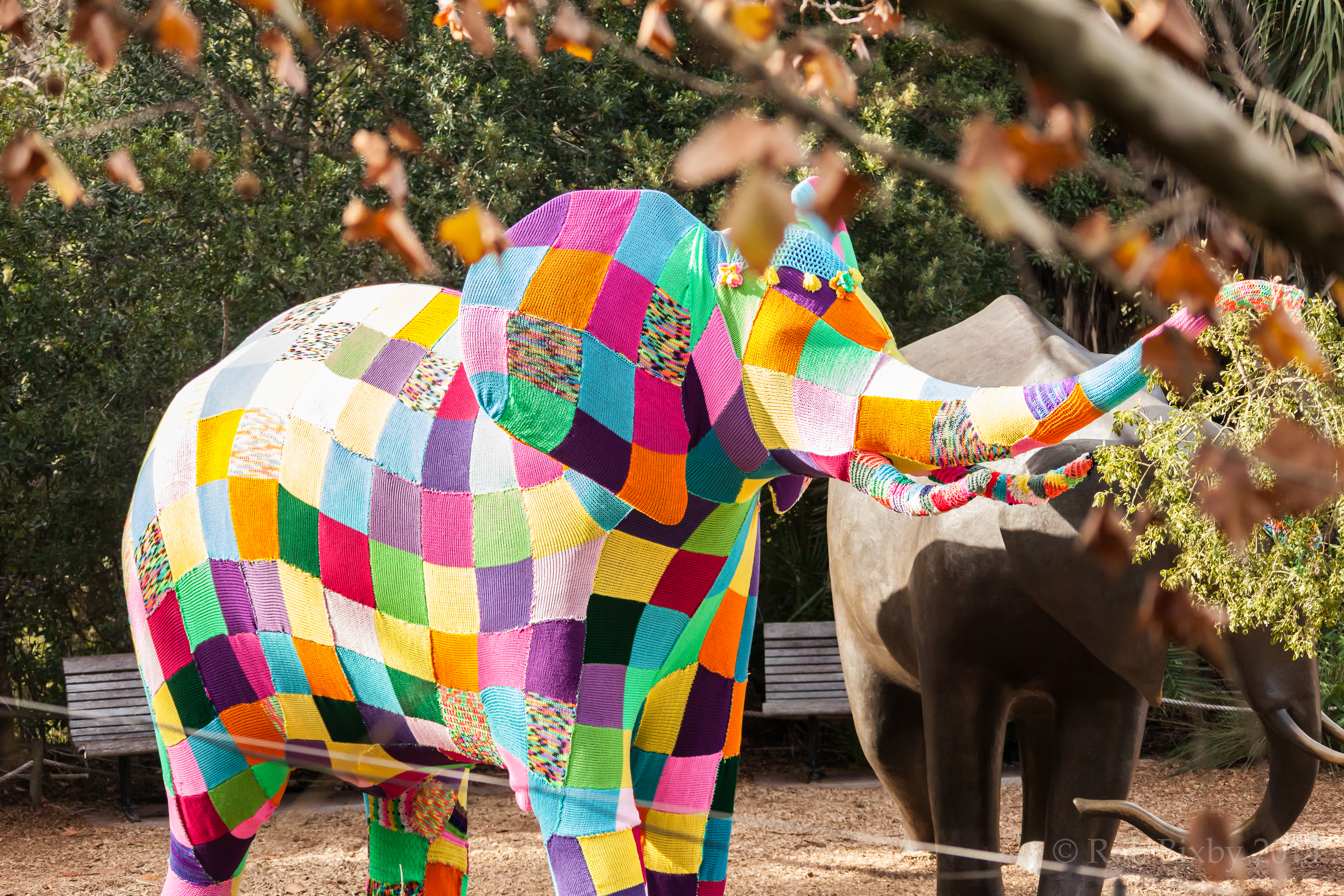
Artwork at the zoo
