= Slender anole =

There are two species of anole named slender anole:

- Anolis fuscoauratus, native to northern South America
- Anolis limifrons, native to Guatemala, Belize, Honduras, Nicaragua, Costa Rica, and Panama
