= Kurupukari =

- Location in Guyana
- Coordinates: 4°40′19″N 58°40′13″W
- Country: Guyana
- Region: Upper Demerara-Berbice
- Elevation: 81 m (266 ft)

Population (2012)
  - Total: 244

Fairview (Kurupukari) is an Indigenous settlement on the Essequibo River, in the Upper Demerara-Berbice region of Guyana. It is the entry point to the Iwokrama Forest. Former president David A. Granger once referred to Iwokrama as the "green heart of Guyana."

The demographics of the village include mostly Lokono, Macushi, Wapishana and more recently, Patamona people.

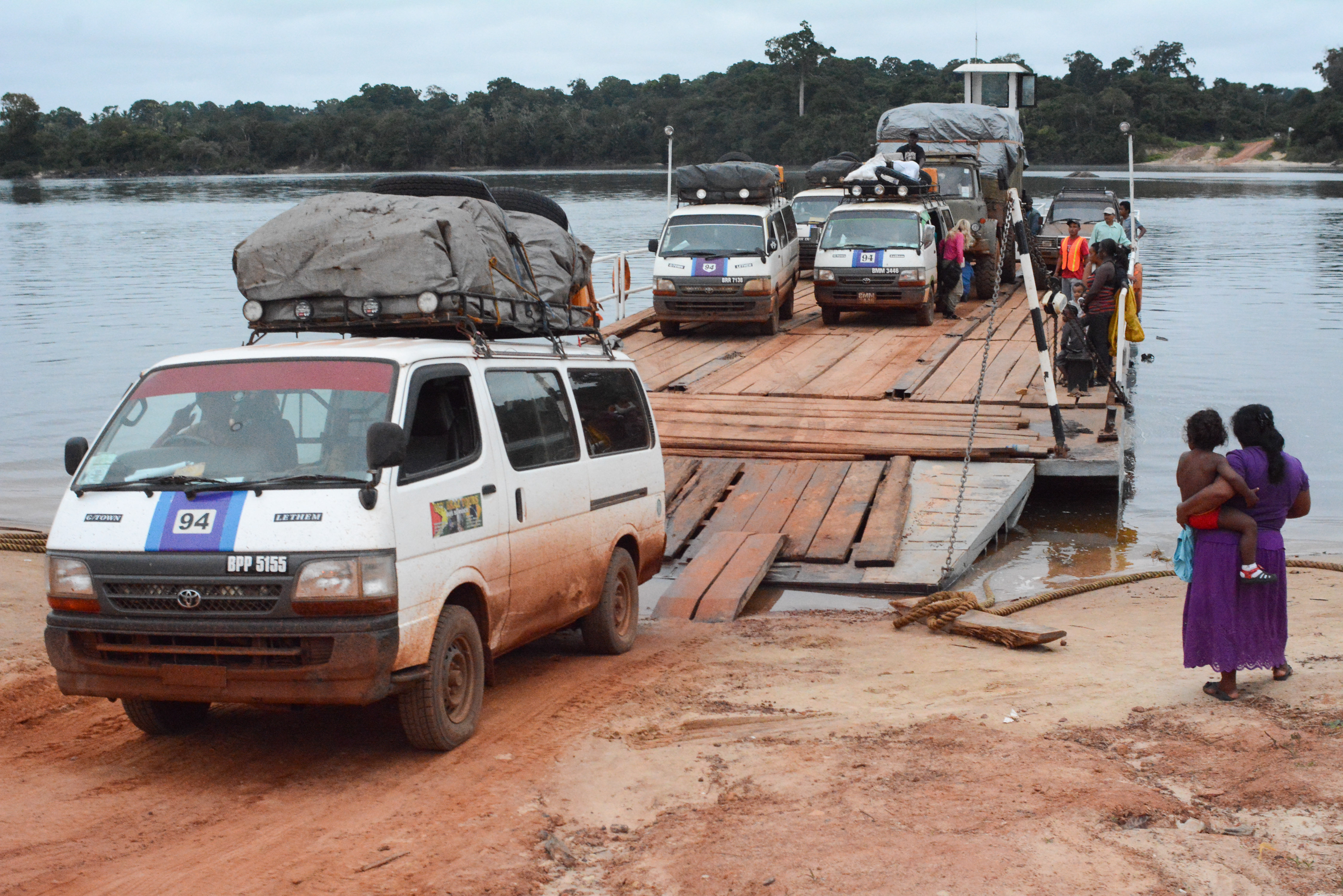
The ferry crossing at Kurupukari.

The Linden-Lethem Road crosses the river here by a ferry. Fairview on the west side of the Essequibo River, has an unpaved airstrip, as well as a public health post, a primary and nursery school.

== Ecological community ==
Fairview village has a conservation area for Blue-and-yellow macaws. The village also manages a Sustainable Use Area of the Iwokrama Forest. A 1990-1997 baseline inventory of fauna in the Kurupukari area included specimens of amphibians and reptiles such as Smooth-sided toad, Map tree frog, White-lined leaf frog, Anolis fuscoauratus, and Erythrolamprus aesculapii.

== History ==
Amerindian settlement of the area goes back thousands of years, with evidence of pottery found in archeological digs.

Kurupukari was an outpost point on the Rupununi Cattle Trail which operated between 1920 and 1953, the first overland link between the coastal region and the Rupununi. The contemporary founding of the settlement was in 1925, by three siblings and their extended family; Miriam, Eunice, and Arthur Andries. The main economic activity of the forest was bleeding the latex (or balata) from Manilkara bidentata trees, but when the value plummeted, workers from the Apoteri balata factory relocated to Fairview. In 1992, Fairview was connected to the Linden-Lethem Road. In 2006, Fairview received the title for approximately 21,950.82 hectares of village lands.

== See also ==
- Iwokrama International Centre for Rain Forest Conservation and Development
