= Anolis lynchi =

Conservation status
- Least Concern (IUCN 3.1)

Scientific classification
- Kingdom: Animalia
- Phylum: Chordata
- Class: Reptilia
- Order: Squamata
- Suborder: Iguania
- Family: Dactyloidae
- Genus: Anolis
- Species: A. lynchi

Binomial name
- Anolis lynchi Miyata, 1985

Species of lizard

Anolis lynchi, also known commonly as Lynch's anole and el cameleón sudamericano de Lynch in South American Spanish, is a species of lizard in the family Dactyloidae. The species is native to northwestern South America.

== Etymology ==
The specific name, lynchi, is in honor of American herpetologist John Douglas Lynch.

== Geographic range ==
Anolis lynchi is found in southwestern Colombia and adjacent northwestern Ecuador.

== Habitat ==
The preferred natural habitat of Anolis lynchi is forest, at altitudes around 600 m (2,000 ft).

== Reproduction ==
Anolis lynchi is oviparous.

== Taxonomy ==
Anolis lynchi is a member of the Anolis auratus species group.
