= Burro-Burro River =

Coordinates: 4.7667°N 58.8667°W

Location
- Country: Guyana

The Burro-Burro River is a river of Guyana.

It flows directly through the Iwokrama Forest, and is an important water source for the Macushi as well as used for ecotourism. It is protected for limited use of subsistence fishing, and the river is monitored for illegal fishing and hunting. It is categorized as a black-water river, flanked by lowland tropical forest.

The river is the site of archaic petroglyphs, man-made depressions and chipping stations for manufacturing stone tools.

== Biodiversity ==
It is home to animals such as the Yellow-banded poison dart frog, black caiman, and capuchin monkeys.

== See also ==
- List of rivers of Guyana
