= Anolis gruuo =

Conservation status
- Endangered (IUCN 3.1)

Scientific classification
- Kingdom: Animalia
- Phylum: Chordata
- Class: Reptilia
- Order: Squamata
- Suborder: Iguania
- Family: Anolidae
- Genus: Anolis
- Species: A. gruuo

Binomial name
- Anolis gruuo Köhler, Ponce, Sunyer, & Batista, 2007

Species of lizard

Anolis gruuo is a species of lizard in the family Dactyloidae. It is a moderately-sized anole for its genus, growing to a maximum snout–vent length of 52 mm (2.0 in). It has a brownish back and dirty-white underside with brownish speckling. Males have orangish dewlaps with brownish gorgetal scales, while females have smaller dewlaps with whitish gorgetal scales. The anole is endemic to Panama, where it is found disjunctly in the Serranía de Tabasará mountain range of the Ngäbe-Buglé Comarca and in Veraguas Province. It is found in montane rainforests, woodland edges, and cultivated areas with tree cover at elevations of 860–1,630 m (2,820–5,350 ft). It is classified as being endangered by the IUCN on the basis of its limited range and ongoing deforestation in the Serranía de Tabasará..

== Taxonomy ==
Anolis gruuo was formally described in 2007 based on an adult male specimen collected from San Félix River in the Serranía de Tabasará mountain range in Panama. The species is named after the indigenous Ngäbere name for anoles. The anole is part of the A. auratus species group. The large genus Anolis is sometimes split into multiple smaller genera, in which case A. gruuo is placed in the genus Norops.

== Description ==
Anolis gruuo is a moderately-sized anole for its genus, growing to a maximum snout–vent length of 52 mm (2.0 in). Males have orangish dewlaps with grayish-brown gorgetal scales. Females have smaller dewlaps with whitish gorgetal scales. The back is brownish, while the underside of the body is dirty-white with brownish speckling. Tails have strongly contrasting gray-and-brown rings. The iris is rufous-brown.

== Distribution and habitat ==
Anolis gruuo is endemic to Panama, where it occurs in the Ngäbe-Buglé Comarca and Veraguas Province. It was initially described from the Serranía de Tabasará mountain range, while subsequent surveys have expanded its range both within the range and east to the Santa Fe highlands and La Yeguada Forest Reserve in Veraguas. The species is found at elevations of 860–1,630 m (2,820–5,350 ft). It inhabits montane rainforests, woodland edges, gardens, and shaded plantations. The species is frequently encountered sleeping on vegetation up to a few meters high.

== Conservation ==
Anolis gruuo is classified as being endangered by the IUCN on the basis of its limited range and ongoing deforestation in the Serranía de Tabasará. The species is threatened by the setting of fires to clear land for agriculture. Although it can adjust somewhat to disturbed habitats, it is dependent on forested environments and thus is highly vulnerable to deforestation. It occurs in two protected areas, the La Yeguada Forest Reserve and Santa Fe National Park.
