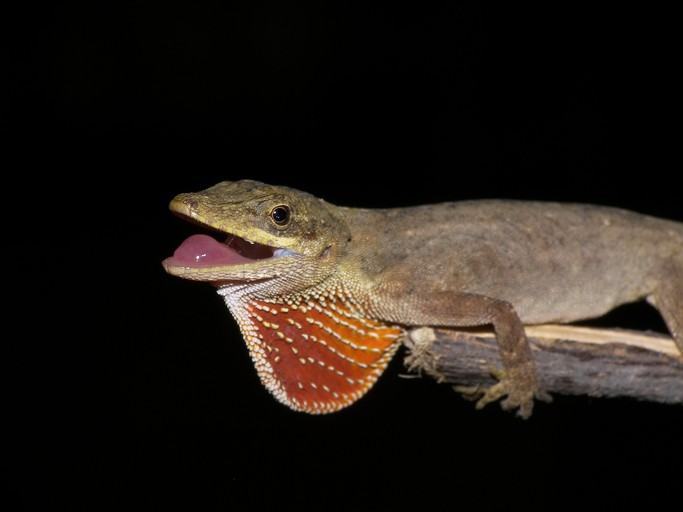

Conservation status
- Least Concern (IUCN 3.1)

Scientific classification
- Kingdom: Animalia
- Phylum: Chordata
- Class: Reptilia
- Order: Squamata
- Suborder: Iguania
- Family: Anolidae
- Genus: Anolis
- Species: A. mariarum

Binomial name
- Anolis mariarum Barbour, 1932

Synonyms
- Norops mariarum (Barbour, 1932)

= Anolis mariarum =

Species of lizard

Anolis mariarum, also known commonly as the blemished anole, is a species of lizard in the family Dactyloidae. The species is endemic to Colombia.

== Geographic range ==
Anolis mariarum is found in central northwestern Colombia, in the department of Antioquia.

== Etymology ==
The specific name, mariarum (Latin, genitive, plural), is in honor of two Roman Catholic monks, Brother Apolinar Maria (1877–1949) and Brother Nicéforo Maria (1888–1980).

== Habitat ==
The preferred natural habitat of Anolis mariarum is forest, at altitudes of 1,300–2,900 m (4,300–9,500 ft), but it has also been found in disturbed areas such as city parks and forest edges.

== Reproduction ==
Anolis mariarum is oviparous.

== Taxonomy ==
Anolis mariarum is a member of the Anolis auratus species group.
