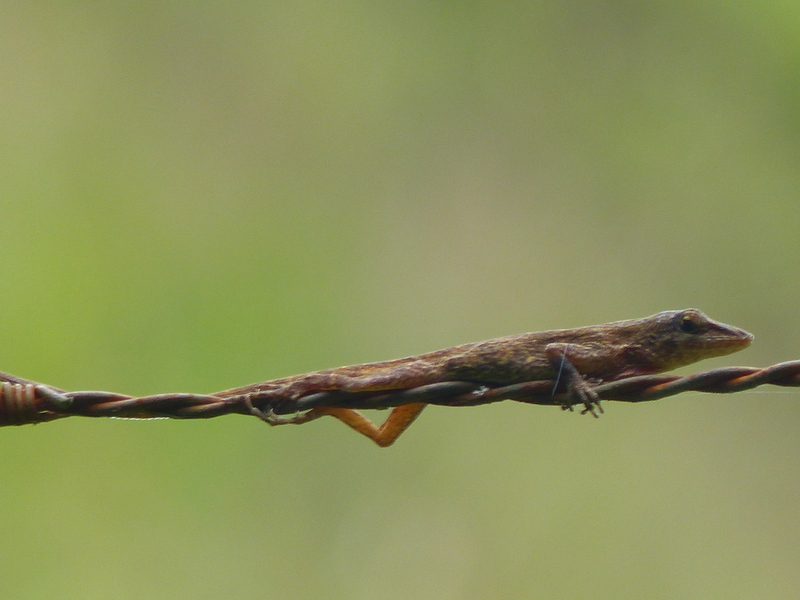

Conservation status
- Least Concern (IUCN 3.1)

Scientific classification
- Kingdom: Animalia
- Phylum: Chordata
- Class: Reptilia
- Order: Squamata
- Suborder: Iguania
- Family: Dactyloidae
- Genus: Anolis
- Species: A. kemptoni

Binomial name
- Anolis kemptoni Dunn, 1940

Synonyms
- Norops pandoensis Savage & Guyer, 1998; Norops kemptoni — G. Köhler, 2000

= Anolis kemptoni =

Species of lizard

Anolis kemptoni, or Kempton's anole, is a species of lizard in the family Dactyloidae. The species is native to Central America.

== Etymology ==
The specific name, kemptoni, is in honor of American physician Kempton Potter Aiken Taylor, who was the younger brother of poet Conrad Aiken.

== Geographic range ==
A. kemptoni is native to Costa Rica and Panama.

== Habitat ==
The preferred natural habitat of A. kemptoni is forest, at altitudes of 1,100–2,000 m (3,610–6,560 ft).

== Behavior ==
A. kemptoni is semiarboreal.

== Reproduction ==
A. kemptoni is oviparous.

== Taxonomy ==
A. kemptoni is a member of the Anolis auratus species group.
