= Anolis latifrons =

Scientific classification
- Kingdom: Animalia
- Phylum: Chordata
- Class: Reptilia
- Order: Squamata
- Suborder: Iguania
- Family: Dactyloidae
- Genus: Anolis
- Species: A. latifrons

Binomial name
- Anolis latifrons Berthold, 1846

Species of lizard

Anolis latifrons is a species of lizard belonging to the family Dactyloidae, primarily found in Colombia and Panama.

This species, commonly referred to as the broad-headed anole, is known for its distinctive large head relative to its body size, vibrant green coloration, and the ability to change shades for camouflage. A. latifrons inhabits lowland rainforests and is arboreal, spending much of its time in trees. Like other anoles, it is diurnal and feeds on a diet of insects and small invertebrates. The species plays a role in maintaining ecological balance within its habitat.
