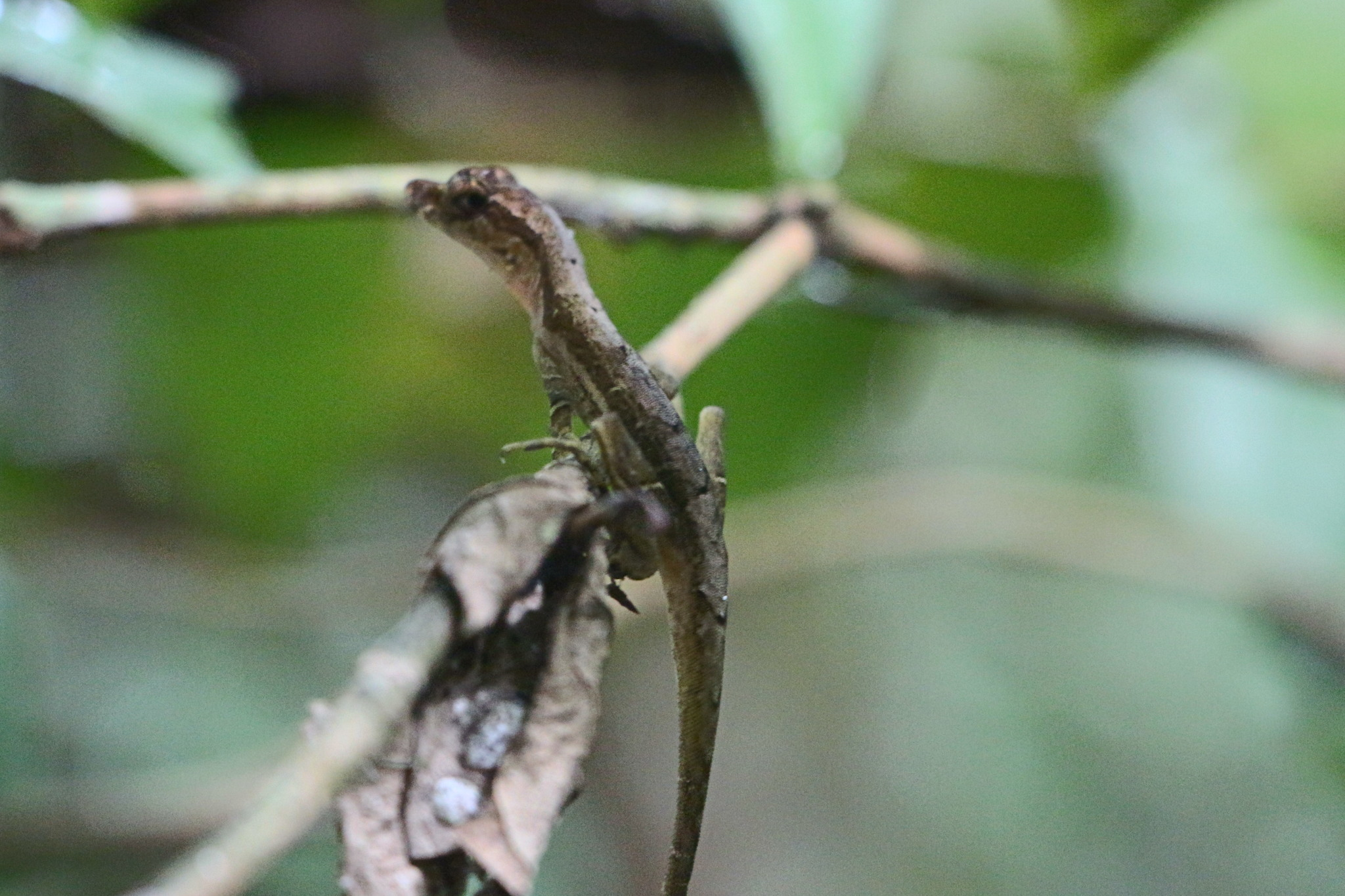

Conservation status
- Least Concern (IUCN 3.1)

Scientific classification
- Kingdom: Animalia
- Phylum: Chordata
- Class: Reptilia
- Order: Squamata
- Suborder: Iguania
- Family: Dactyloidae
- Genus: Anolis
- Species: A. trachyderma

Binomial name
- Anolis trachyderma Cope, 1875

Synonyms
- List: Anolis leptoscelis Boulenger, 1885; Anolis macropus Cope, 1885; Anolis garbei Amaral, 1933; Norops trachyderma Savage & Guyer, 1989; Norops leptoscelis Lehr, 2002

= Anolis trachyderma =

Species of lizard

Anolis trachyderma, the roughskin anole or common forest anole, is a species of lizard in the family Dactyloidae. The species is found in Colombia, Peru, Brazil, and Ecuador.
