= Iwokrama Forest =

Forest in Guyana

- IUCN category VI (protected area with sustainable use of natural resources)
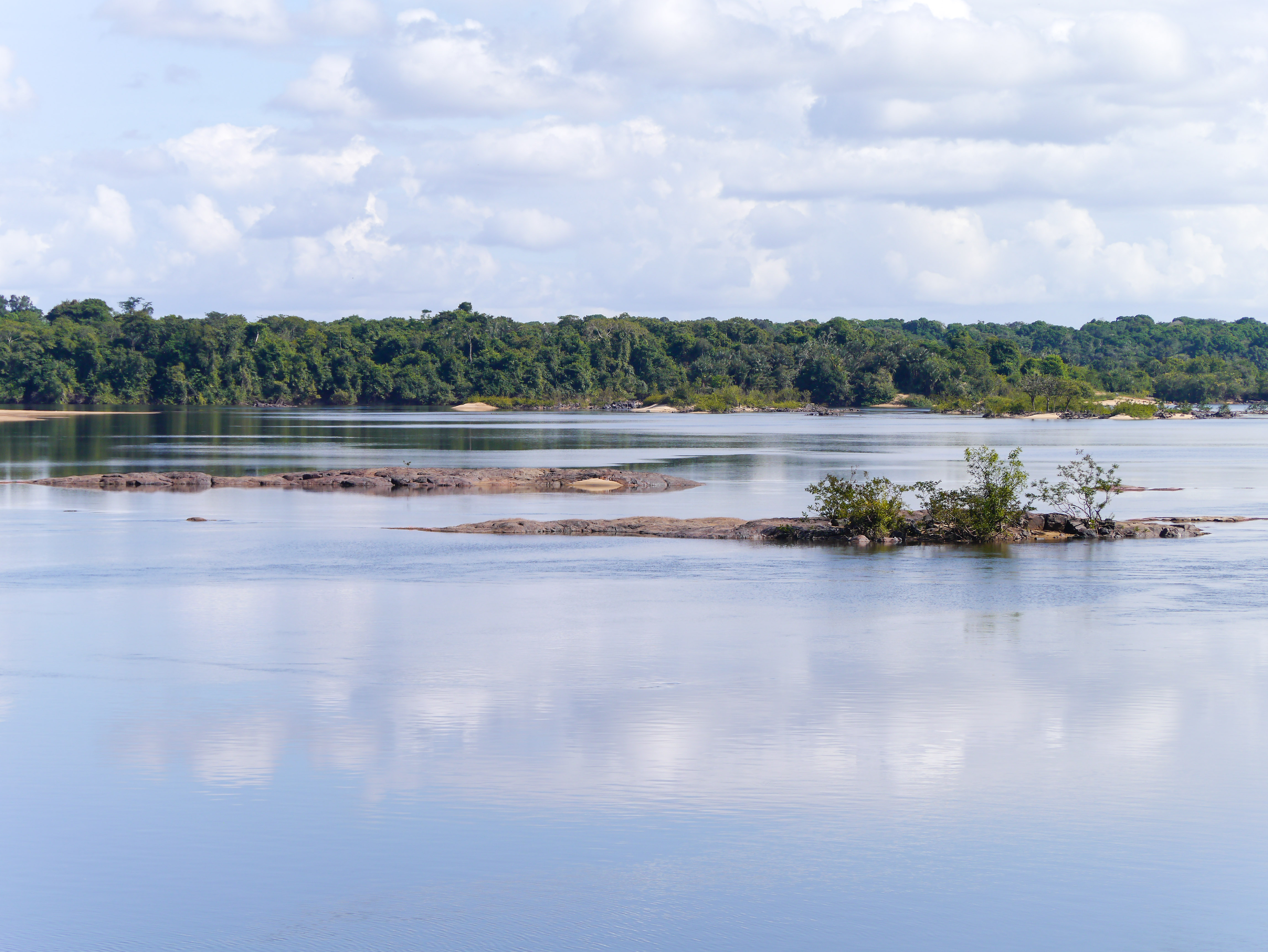

- Location within Guyana
- Location: Central Guyana
- Nearest city: Kurupukari
- Coordinates: 4.5°N 59°W
- Area: 3,716.1 km^{2} (1,434.8 sq mi)
- Established: 1996
- Governing body: Protected Areas Trust
- Website: Iwokrama.org

The Iwokrama Forest is a 3,716 square kilometres (1,435 sq mi) nature reserve of central Guyana located in the Guiana Shield, The area is 85 km (53 mi) at its widest point east to west and 80 km (50 mi) north to south. It is bisected by the Georgetown–Lethem Road. The forest lies between 4° and 5° north latitude and 58.5 and 59.5 degrees west longitude and is bordered by the Pakaraima Mountains on the west, isolated highlands on the east, savannahs on the southwest and northwest. The Essequibo River forms the eastern boundary. The northern boundary is the Siparuni River. The Burro-Burro River runs through the centre, and most of its watershed is within the forest.

The area is covered with lowland tropical forest.

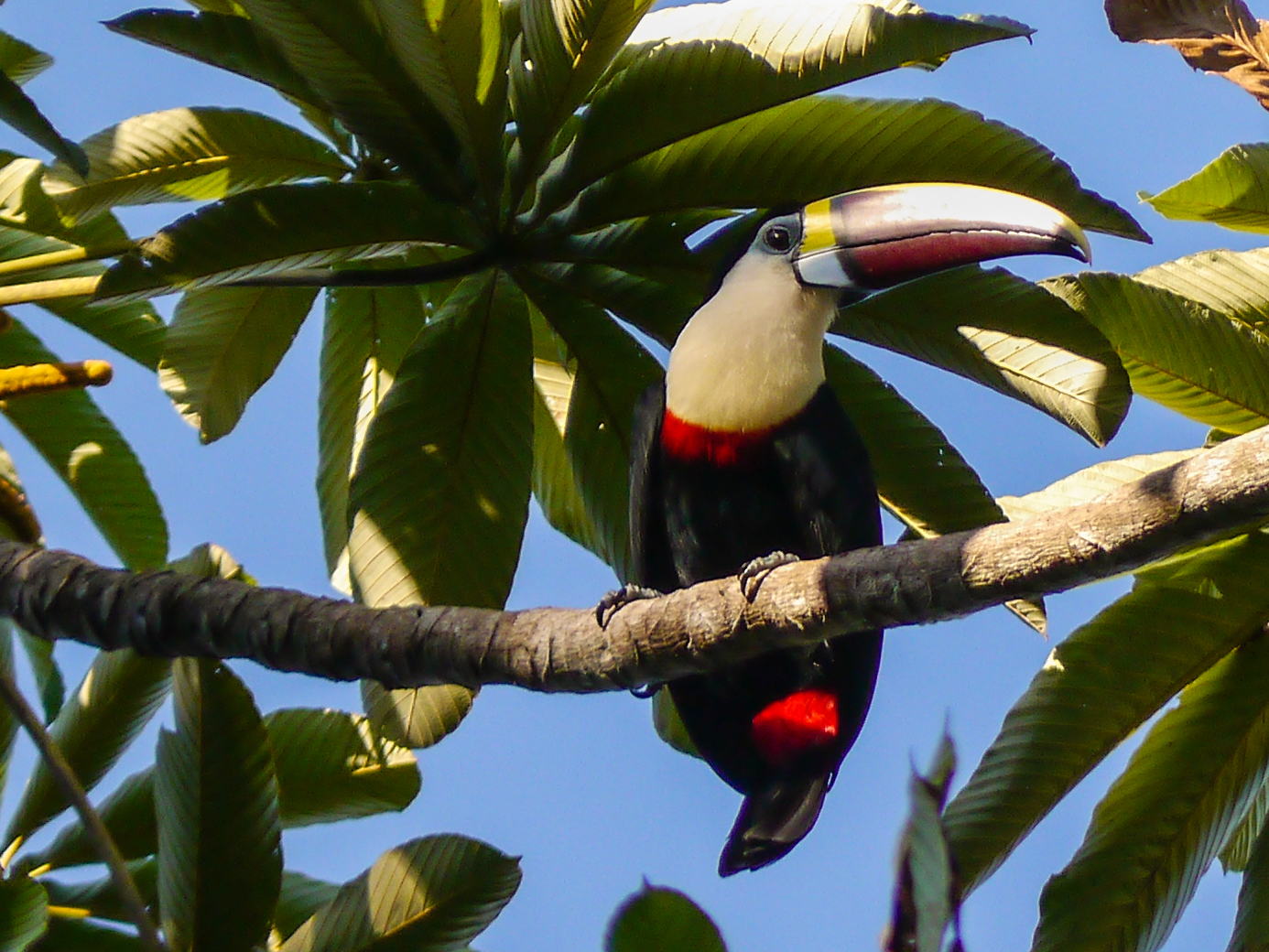
White-throated Toucan in the Iwokrama Forest
