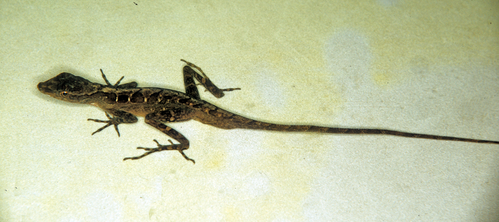

Conservation status
- Least Concern (IUCN 3.1)

Scientific classification
- Kingdom: Animalia
- Phylum: Chordata
- Class: Reptilia
- Order: Squamata
- Suborder: Iguania
- Family: Dactyloidae
- Genus: Anolis
- Species: A. tropidogaster

Binomial name
- Anolis tropidogaster Hallowell, 1856

= Anolis tropidogaster =

Species of lizard

Anolis tropidogaster, the tropical anole, is a species of lizard in the family Dactyloidae. The species is found in Colombia, Panama, and Venezuela.
