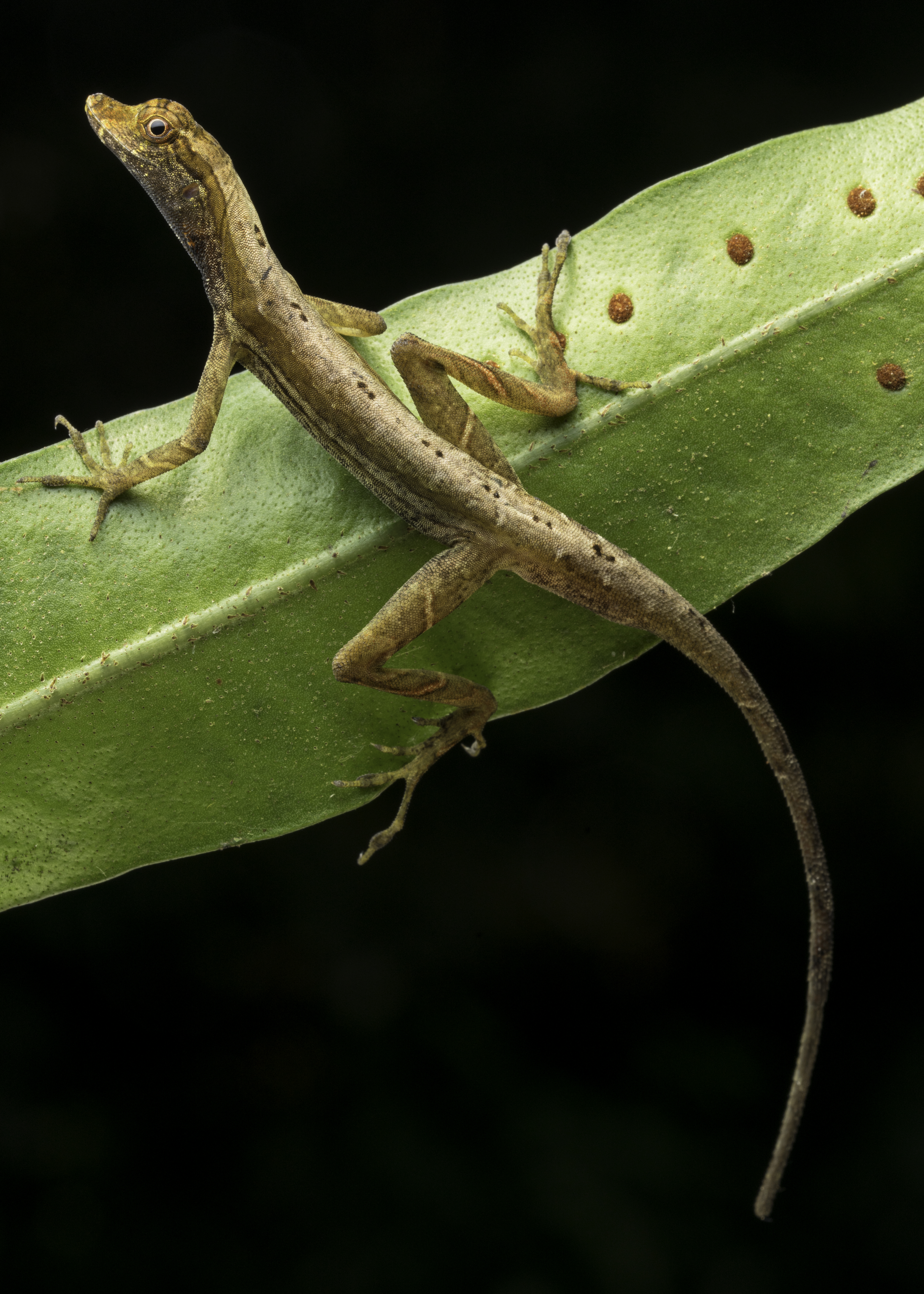
- Slender Anole, Yasuni National Park, Ecuador

Conservation status
- Least Concern (IUCN 3.1)

Scientific classification
- Kingdom: Animalia
- Phylum: Chordata
- Class: Reptilia
- Order: Squamata
- Suborder: Iguania
- Family: Dactyloidae
- Genus: Anolis
- Species: A. fuscoauratus

Binomial name
- Anolis fuscoauratus d'Orbigny in A.M.C. Duméril & Bibron, 1837

Synonyms
- Anolis fusco-auratus d'Orbigny in A.M.C. Duméril & Bibron, 1837; Dactyloa (Tropidopilus) fusco-auratus — Fitzinger, 1843; Anolis viridiaeneus W. Peters, 1863; Anolis bocourtii Cope, 1875; Anolis brumetii Thominot, 1887; Anolis scapularis Boulenger, 1908; Anolis kugleri Roux, 1929; Anolis fuscoauratus — Rand & Humphrey, 1968; Norops fuscoauratus — Savage & Guyer, 1989; Anolis fuscoauratus — Dirksen & De la Riva, 1999

= Anolis fuscoauratus =

Species of lizard

Anolis fuscoauratus, commonly known as the slender anole, slender Amazon anole, or brown-eared anole, is a species of lizard in the family Dactyloidae. The species is native to northern South America and Panama.

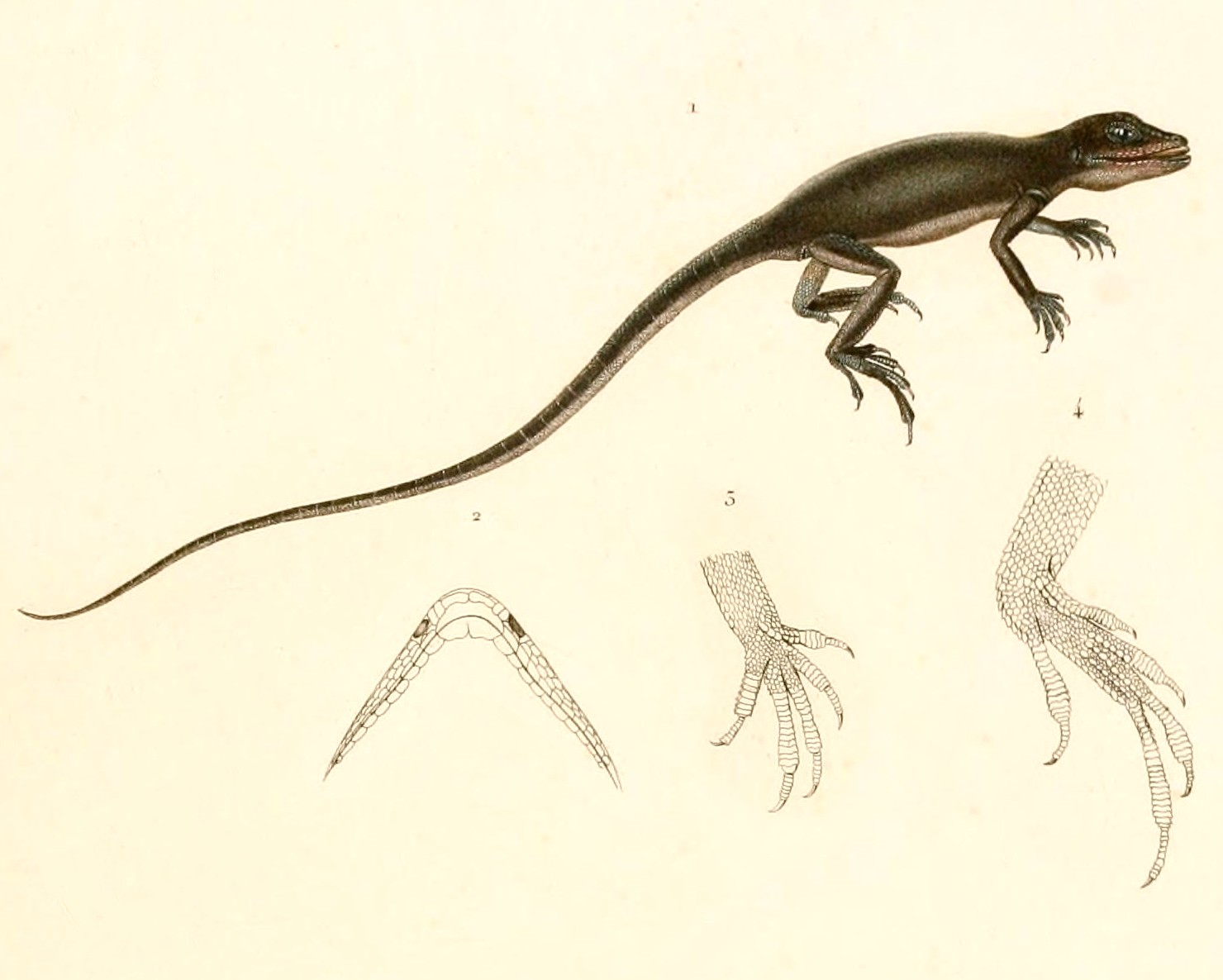
Illustration

It was described as a new species in 1837. In 2009 the geographic range of this widespread species was found to extend farther south to Rio de Janeiro State in Brazil.

== Names ==
The specific name, fuscoauratus, is derived from the Latin roots fuscus (combining form, fusco-) meaning "dark" and auratus meaning "golden". The name describes the lizard's morphological characteristic of having a dark gold skin colour.

It is called tai tsjõ in the Kwaza language of Rondônia, Brazil.

== Habitat ==
The preferred natural habitat of A. fuscoauratus is forest, at altitudes from sea level to 1,800 m (5,910 ft).

== Behaviour ==
A. fuscoauratus is arboreal.

== Diet ==
A. fuscoauratus preys upon spiders, insects, and insect larvae.

== Reproduction ==
A. fuscoauratus is oviparous.

== See also ==
- List of Anolis lizards
