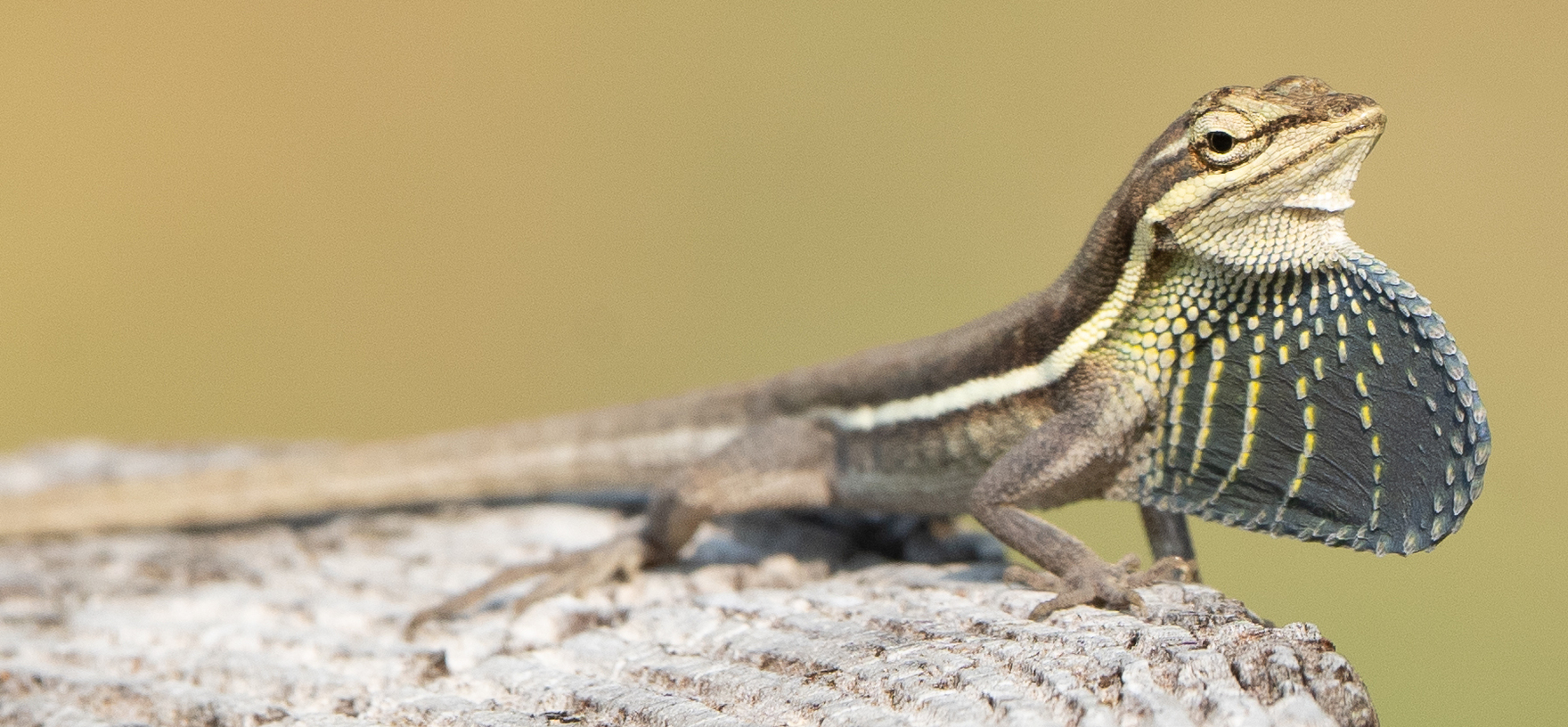

Conservation status
- Least Concern (IUCN 3.1)

Scientific classification
- Kingdom: Animalia
- Phylum: Chordata
- Class: Reptilia
- Order: Squamata
- Suborder: Iguania
- Family: Dactyloidae
- Genus: Anolis
- Species: A. auratus

Binomial name
- Anolis auratus Daudin, 1802

= Anolis auratus =

Species of lizard

Anolis auratus, the grass anole, is a species of lizard in the family Dactyloidae. The species is found in Costa Rica, Panama, Venezuela, Colombia, French Guiana, Guyana, and Brazil.

== Description ==
Though A. auratus presents a variety of physical characteristics based on geographic location, maturity, and sex, a common feature is a tan-coloured back with cream or dark brown to black lateral stripes, copper orange spots on the posterior thigh, a bright orange tongue, as well as an overall tan tail with light gray or black streaks, blotches, or stripes on the dorsal surface but orange coloration underneath. The female has a smaller dewlap with gray to blue skin in between cream scales, while the male possesses a larger dewlap, similar in skin color to that of the female but with yellow scales at the center and base of the structure.

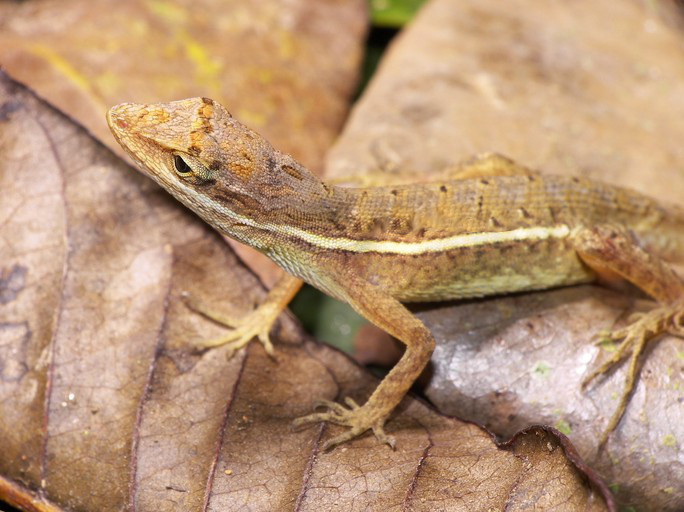
Grass anole

In general, male and female A. auratus exhibit differences in pelvis width, trunk length, and head size, and thus, are sexually dimorphic with females possessing bigger pelvises and trunks and males having larger heads. As females play a more important role in reproduction, their larger trunks and wider pelvises allow them to carry more eggs as well as oviposit, or lay, heavier and bigger eggs respectively. On the other hand, males exhibit larger head dimensions than females, which may be attributable to their participation in male-to-male competitive interactions for female mates, resources, and/or territories. Predominantly used as a weapon during male-to-male combat, the head size plays a significant role in establishing dominance, territoriality, fitness, as well as mating success since a bigger head may be associated with greater jaw strength and thus, stronger bite force.

== Geographic range and habitat ==
A. auratus is widely distributed throughout Central America as well as northern regions of South America, extending from Costa Rica and spanning through much of Colombia, Venezuela, Brazil, Surinam, and the Guyanas.

Unlike other Anolis species, A. auratus inhabits moderately verdant grasslands rather than arboreal, or branchy, environments, which researchers presume may have given rise to its unique social organization. It prefers to live in fields, roadsides, or river edge marshes, and avoid shaded, brushy, as well as second growth regions. These grassy habitats are extremely short-lived, as they develop from some kind of disturbance to the area, like flooding, burning, or clearing by humans, and eventually become uninhabitable, growing into secondary forests. Hence, the grass anole doesn't occupy a single permanent territory throughout its lifetime; rather, it is continually on the move from habitat to habitat, relocating once its previous dwelling is destroyed by a disturbance or eliminated via natural processes. Moreover, vegetation is dense near the ground with long grass stalks sprouting out, which leaves any and all elevated perches in the area – primarily used by males for assertion displays – exposed. In addition, insolation is higher in grassy habitats than arboreal ones, suggesting that A. auratus has adapted to tolerate and ultimately favor higher temperatures.

A. auratus is mainly found in Panama but can be found across northern South America in open, grassy areas such as fields. It tends to avoid shaded areas.

== Diet ==
Described as a sit-and-wait predator, A. auratus forages for its food by spending most of the day sitting and waiting for prey to pass. Its diet consists mainly of invertebrates, more specifically arthropods, including Hymenoptera, Hemiptera, Chilopoda, Araneae, Orthoptera, and larvae. Generally, it is known to be an opportunistic feeder, ingesting a wide variety of arthropods and selecting prey on the basis of size rather than species type or identity. Furthermore, the size of the grass anole significantly affects the size of its prey, as bigger lizards have larger mouths, to effectively consume more massive arthropods. Diet may also vary throughout the seasons.

== Ecology and behavior ==
=== Territoriality ===
Males almost exclusively use their territories for access to mates rather than access to food since competition for food is low within the species. Males use displays to assert dominance over others males and attract females. These displays consist of moving the head and dewlap up and down in a sinusoidal fashion. A territorial male will approach another lizard to perform its display, and the sex and response of the conspecific will determine the result of the challenge. If the conspecific is female or a juvenile, it is tolerated within the male's territory. If the conspecific is another adult male, it is tolerated if it gives a head nod, but is chased away or engaged in agonistic behavior if it does not give a head nod or gives a challenge display. If the adult male conspecific loses the challenge, it can stay within the territory as a subordinate.

Since A. auratus' habitat has abundant vegetation, the effectiveness of head displays may be affected by the moving vegetation, especially in the wind. Displays can also be affected by the vantage point of females, which are usually low in the grass and become habituated to movement patterns in the moving vegetation. Therefore, displays are most successful when using a sinusoidal movement pattern when there is no wind, but even with wind, displays are able to generally avoid reduction in effectiveness from habituation.

=== Social behavior ===
The social system of A. auratus is described as that of a "tyrant-subordinate" system, in which there is one dominant territorial male with subordinate underlings occupying the same domain, and the latter group of lizards does not form dominance relationships amongst themselves. This social hierarchy has been observed and maintained during breeding seasons at natural population densities in the grass anole, rendering the behavior unique to this species, and many researchers attribute this phenomenon to the nature of the grassy habitat. Due to the transient formation and destruction of grasslands, subordinate males assume a higher net risk when challenging dominant males for territory ownership since the former must endure the high costs of fighting only to enjoy territorial dominion for a brief moment; thus, subordinates do not stand up against and engage in territorial battles with their dominants, as they will all have to relocate once their current grassy habitation becomes uninhabitable anyway. In accordance with this reasoning, dominant males also save energy by not forcing and driving out all the subordinate males from their territories, ultimately preserving the social organization. Furthermore, the exposed perches of these verdant lands make it difficult for subordinates to participate in displays for mating without getting caught by the dominant territory owners, leaving the subordinates no other choice but to comply. Consequently, the distinct "tyrant-subordinate" social system is maintained in A. auratus as a result of habitat demands.

Additionally, research studies show that individual A. auratus lizards prefer to associate with one another irrespective of size or sex. While in the absence of other conspecifics, they socialize with A. tropidogaster – a morphologically similar species. Previously, conspecific recognition was presumed to solely play a role in mate selection, aiding in reproductive isolation; however, the association of A. auratus with A. tropidogaster when conspecifics are not present as well as the tendency for same sex individuals to associate with one another suggest a purpose beyond reproductive selection. Accordingly, researchers attribute the attraction of conspecifics in the grass anole as a means of correct habitat selection, in which conspecifics are used as cues in deciding where one should settle in and occupy. The presence of conspecifics in a particular dwelling or environment may verify its suitability for livelihood in terms of resource availability and daily movements, in addition to potential for mates.

==== Adult sociality ====
When given the choice of interacting with the same species or a morphologically similar species, A. auratus almost always chooses to interact with individuals of its own species. It only chooses to interact with other species when conspecifics are not around. This behavior suggests that being selective aids in reproductive isolation. It also suggests that being around conspecifics is important in habitat selection.

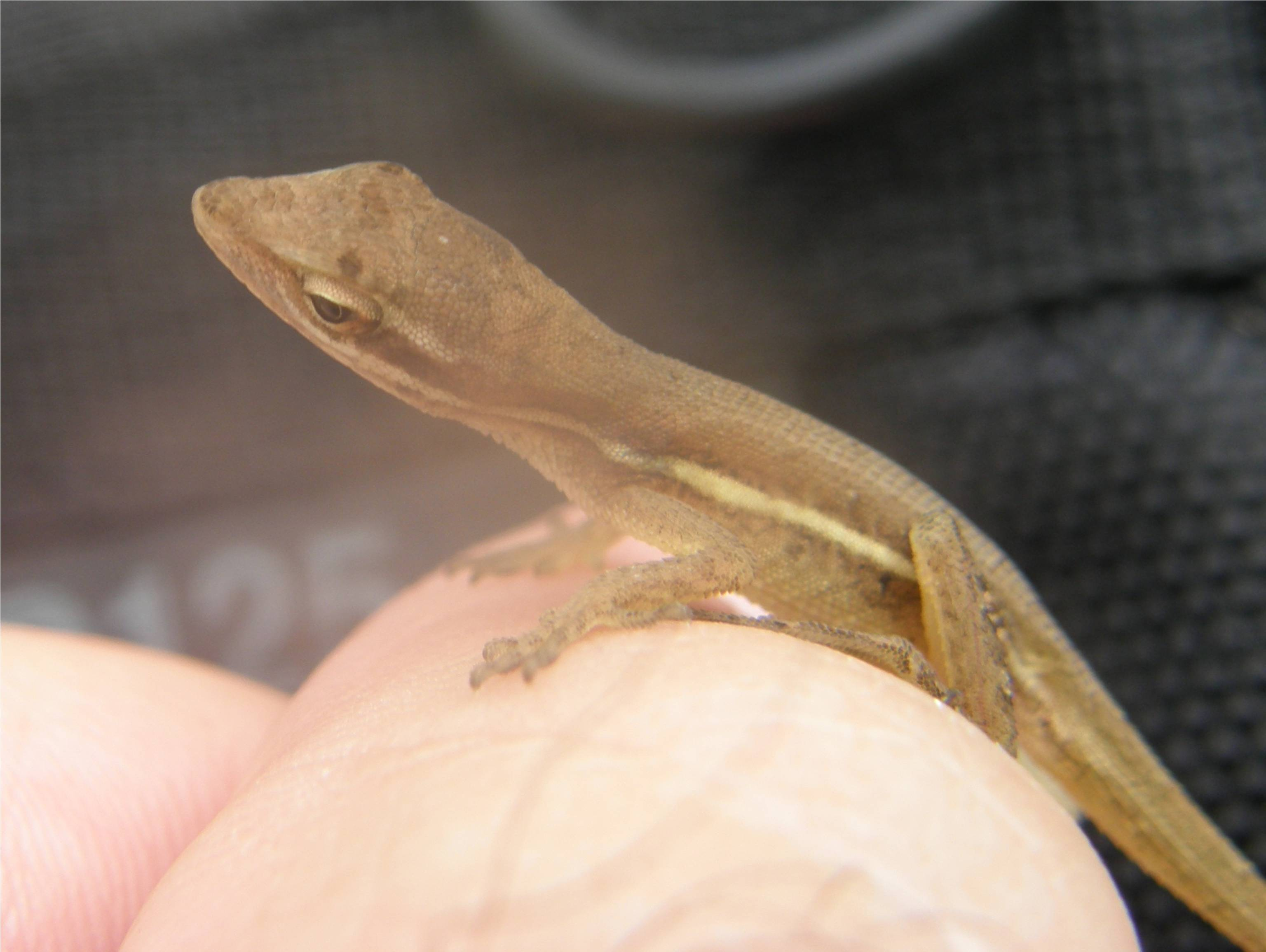
Anolis auratus size comparison with a human finger

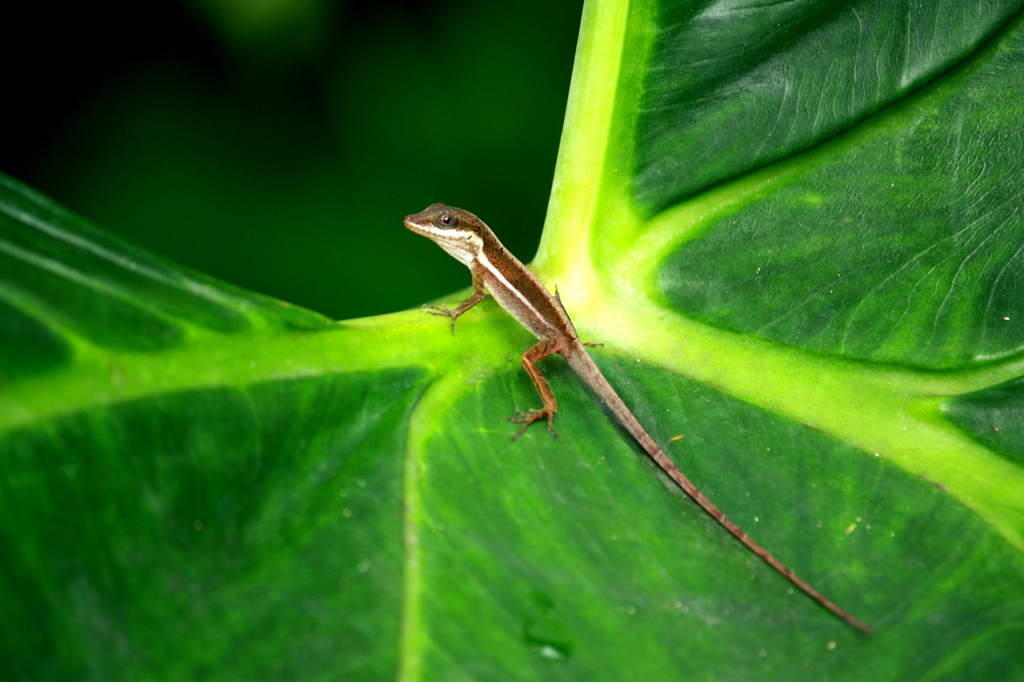
Grass anole observed in natural habitat
