= Haemosporidiasina =

Scientific classification
- Domain: Eukaryota
- (unranked): SAR
- (unranked): Alveolata
- Phylum: Apicomplexa
- Subclass: Haemosporidiasina Euzéby, 1988

Subclass of single-celled organisms

Haemosporidiasina (Haemosporidia) is a subclass of apicomplexans described by Jacques Euzéby in 1988. The taxon is very similar to Aconoidasida.

== Taxonomy ==
Haemosporidiasina is divided into two orders:

Order Chromatorida (with pigmented intraerythrocytic parasites)

Suborder Laveraniina

- Family Plasmodiidae
  - Genus Bioccala Landau et al 1984
  - Genus Biguetiella Landau et al 1984
  - Genus Billbraya Paperna & Landau 1990
  - Genus Dionisia Landau et al 1980
  - Genus Hepatocystis Miller 1908
  - Genus Mesnilium Misra, Haldar & Chakravarty 1972
  - Genus Nycteria Garnham and Heisch 1953
  - Genus Plasmodium Marchiafava & Celli 1885
  - Genus Polychromophilus Landau et al 1984
  - Genus Rayella Dasgupta 1967
  - Genus Saurocytozoon Lainson & Shaw 1969
  - Genus Vetufebrus Poinar 2011
- Family Haemoproteidae
  - Genus Johnsprentia Landau, Chavatte & Beveridge 2012
  - Genus Haemocystidium Castellani and Willey 1904, emend. Telford 1996
  - Genus Haemoproteus Kruse 1890
  - Genus Paleohaemoproteus Poinar and Telford 2005
  - Genus Sprattiella Landau et al 2012

Order Achromatorida (with non-pigmented intraerythrocytic parasites)

Suborder Babesiina includes agents of piroplasmosis sensu stricto

- Family Babesiidae This family excludes species that undergo schizogony in lymphocytes before parasitizing erythrocytes: such species belong to the genus Theileria
  - Genus Babesia Starcovici 1893
  - Genus Entopolypoides Mayer 1933
  - Genus Echinozoon Garnham 1951
  - Genus Microbabesia Sohns 1918
  - Genus Rangelia
  - Genus Tunetella Brumpt & Lavier 1935
- Family Haemohormidiidae has several genera, including:
  - Genus Cardiosporidium Van Gaver & Stephan 1907
  - Genus Cristalloidophora Porchet 1978
  - Genus Dobellia Brumpt 1913
  - Genus Echinococcidium Brasil 1902
  - Genus Globidiellum Eisen 1895
  - Genus Haemohormidium Léger & Duboscq 1910
  - Genus Joyeuxella Brasil 1902
  - Genus Rhabdospora Landau, Boulard & Houin 1969
  - Genus Sauroplasma Starcovici 1893
  - Genus Spermatobium Garnham 1951
  - Genus Toxocystis Henry 1910
  - Genus Trophosphaera du Toit 1938

Suborder Theileriina includes parasites of erythrocytes and diverse white blood cells with sexual reproduction by exoerythrocytic or by exo- and endoerythrocytic schizogony.

- Family Theileriidae du Toit 1918
  - Genus Theileria Bettencourt, Franca and Borges 1907
- Family Leucocytozoidae Fallis and Bennett 1961
  - Genus Leucocytozoon
- Family Garniidae Lainson, Landau and Shaw 1971
  - Genus Fallisia
  - Genus Garnia
  - Genus Progarnia
