= Achromatorida =

Scientific classification
- Domain: Eukaryota
- (unranked): SAR
- (unranked): Alveolata
- Phylum: Apicomplexa
- Class: Aconoidasida
- Subclass: Haemosporidiasina
- Order: Achromatorida

Suborders
- Babesiina; Theileriina

Order of single-celled organisms

Achromatorida is an order of non-pigmented intraerythrocytic parasitic alveolates belonging to the subclass Haemosporidiasina. The order was described by Jacques Euzéby in 1988.

The taxonomy of these organisms has been one of some controversy. Weylon in 1926 grouped many of these genera into the genus Babesia - given what is now known about these genera this was probably an error. Agreement on the organisation of these genera probably cannot be regarded as being settled.

== Description ==
These are minute rounded or pyriform parasites found within erythrocytes, or other circulating or endothelial cells of vertebrates. The parasites reproduce by merogony without oocysts or spores.

The apical complex has a polar ring and rhoptries. A conoid is lacking and most species lack the associated pellicular microtubules.

Flagellae are lacking. The trophozoite stage is separated from erythrocyte by single membrane (in the other groups there usually 2 or more). Vectors include ticks and leeches.

== Evolution ==
A Bayesian analysis based on the nuclear genes suggests a date of divergence between Babesia and Theileria of 56.48 million years ago ( 95% credible interval 28.17 million years ago–86.87 million years ago)

== Taxonomy ==
This order is divided into two suborders:

=== Suborder Babesiina ===
These are agents of piroplasmosis sensu stricto. The species have been placed into two families.

Family Babesiidae Poche 1913

This family excludes species that undergo schizogony in lymphocytes before parasitizing erythrocytes. these species have been placed in the genus Theileria.

Species in this family have rhoptries, a polar ring and subpellicular tubules in its apical complex. With the exception of the genus Tunetella which infects tortoises, species in this family infect in warm-blooded vertebrates and are transmitted by ticks.

- Genus Babesia Starcovici 1893
- Genus Echinozoon Garnham 1951
- Genus Entopolypoides Mayer 1933
- Genus Microbabesia Sohns 1918
- Genus Rangelia
- Genus Tunetella Brumpt & Lavier 1935

Family Haemohormidiidae Levine 1984

This family includes species that infect marine animals. A notable exception is the genus Serpentoplasma which infects reptiles. Very little is known about most of these genera.

- Genus Cardiosporidium Gaver & Stephan 1907
- Genus Cristalloidophora Dehorne 1934, Porchet 1978
- Genus Dobellia Brumpt 1913
- Genus Echinococcidium Porchet 1978
- Genus Globidiellum Neumann 1909
- Genus Haemohormidium Léger & Duboscq 1910
- Genus Haematractidium Henry 1910
- Genus Joyeuxella Le Calvez 1939
- Genus Rhabdospora Landau, Boulard & Houin 1969
- Genus Serpentoplasma Pienaar 1962
- Genus Spermatobium Eisen 1895
- Genus Toxocystis Henry 1910
- Genus Trophosphaera du Toit 1938

The genus Nephromyces may also belong to this family.

=== Suborder Theileriina ===
These are parasites of erythrocytes and diverse white blood cells with sexual reproduction by exoerythrocytic or by exo- and endoerythrocytic schizogony.

Family Leucocytozoidae

- Genus Leucocytozoon Ziemann 1898
  - Subgenus Leucocytozoon
  - Subgenus Akiba

Family Garniidae

- Genus Fallisia Lainson, Landau & Shaw 1974
  - Subgenus Fallisia
  - Subgenus Plasmodioides
- Genus Garnia Lainson et al 1971
- Genus Progarnia Lainson 1995

Family Theileriidae (synonym Gonderiidae)

- Genus Cytauxzoon Neitz & Thomas 1948
- Genus Theileria Bettencourt, França and Borges 1907
- Genus Haematoxenus Uilenberg 1964

=== Notes ===
There are also a number of genera of uncertain placement that earlier were provisionally included in this taxon:

Elleipsisoma Franca 1912: This genus is currently placed in the Eimeriorina. Its placement there is unusual given that species in this genus infect erythrocytes.

The families Dactylosomatidae (genera Babesiosoma Jakowski and Nigrelli 1956 and Dactylosoma Labbé 1894) were transferred to the suborder Adeleorina by Boulard et al in 1982. The position of the Anthemosomatidae (genus Anthemosoma Landau, Boulard and Houin 1969) remains unclear.

The genus Nicollia Franca 1910 is now regarded as a synonym for Babesia.

Cytauxzoon replicates in macrophages rather than in lymphocytes. For this reason may be moved to a new family at some point.

Pirhemocyton was described as a protozoan infecting lizards but the intraerythrocytic inclusions have since been shown to be due to a viral infection.

An additional genus - Chelonplasma - has been described but its taxonomic status is unclear.

== Synonyms ==
The classification of the species in this group is difficult. Over the passage of time several genera have been described only to re classified as being synonyms of previously described genera.

Currently recognised synonyms of the genus Babesia include:

- Achromaticus Dionisi 1899
- Apiosoma
- Babesiella Mesnil 1919
- Francaiella Yakimoff 1926
- Haematococcus Babes 1888
- Luhsia Dschunkowsky 1938
- Microsoma Sohns 1918
- Nicollia Franca 1910
- Patonella Ray & Idnani 1943
- Piroplasma Patton 1895
- Pyrosoma Smith 1893
- Rosiella Nuttall 1912
- Sogdianella Schurenkova 1939

Recognised synonyms of the genus Nicollia - which is now itself regarded as a synonym of Babesia - include:

- Nuttallia Franca 1909
- Smithia Franca 1910

Recognised synonyms of the genus Theileria include:

- Gonderia

=== Notes ===
Apiosoma is currently the name of a genus of ciliated protozoa also known as Glossatella. Although this genus is pathogenic to fish it has not related to the parasites in this taxon.

Nuttallia Dall 1898 is a genus of sunset clams (Psammobiidae)
