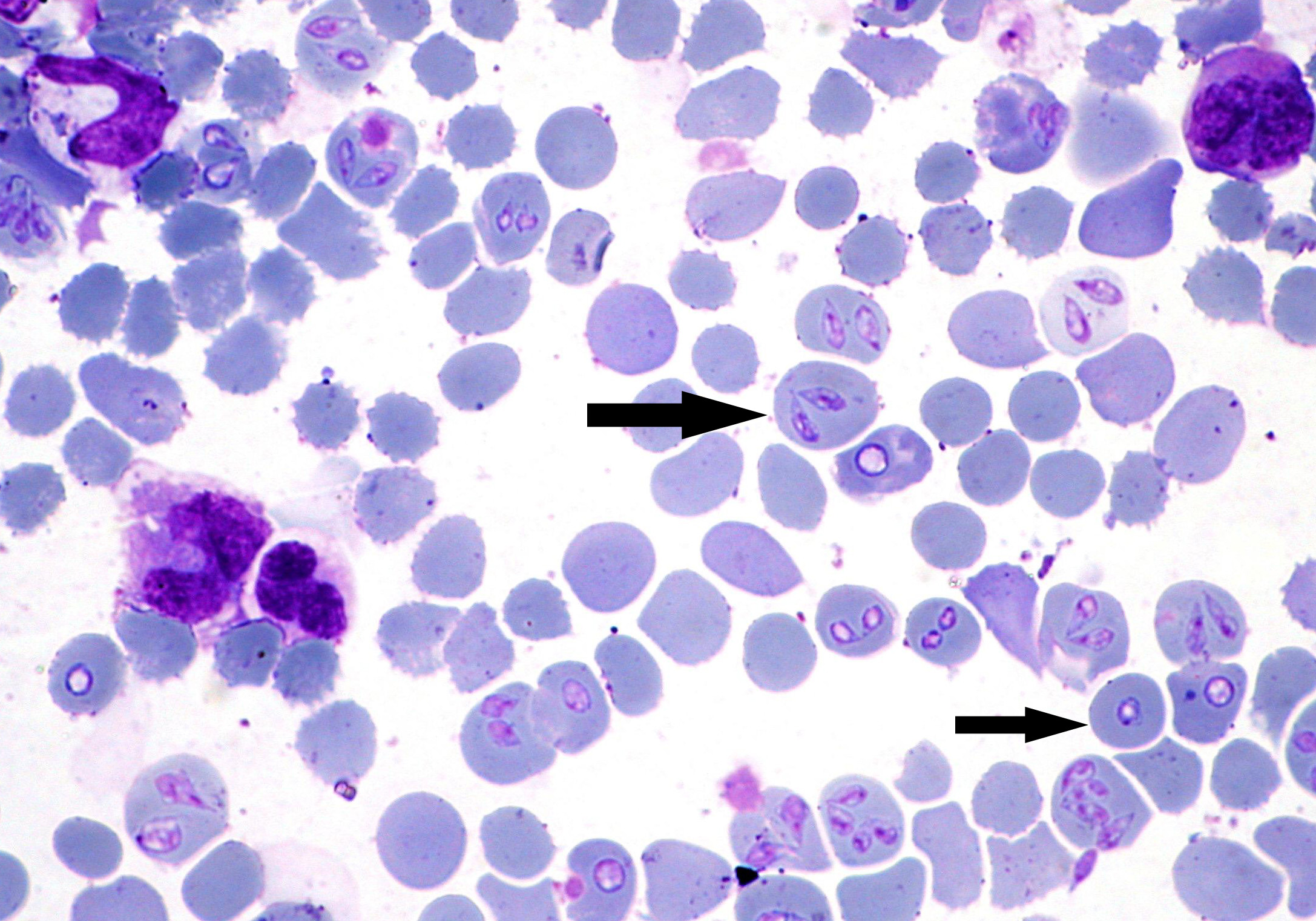
- Babesia canis piroplasm stage infecting red blood cells of a dog. Giemsa stained.

Scientific classification
- Domain: Eukaryota
- Supergroup: Alveolata
- Phylum: Apicomplexa
- Class: Aconoidasida
- Order: Piroplasmida
- Family: Babesiidae
- Genus: Babesia
- Species: B. canis

Binomial name
- Babesia canis (Piana & Galli-Valerio, 1895)

Synonyms
- Piroplasma canis

= Babesia canis =

Species of single-celled organism

Babesia canis is a parasite that infects red blood cells and can lead to anemia. This is a species that falls under the overarching genus Babesia. It is transmitted by the brown dog tick (Rhipicephalus sanguineus) and is one of the most common piroplasm infections. The brown dog tick is adapted to warmer climates and is found in both Europe and the United States, especially in shelters and greyhound kennels. In Europe, it is also transmitted by Dermacentor ticks with an increase in infections reported due to people traveling with their pets.

== Lifecycle ==
A tick carrying B. canis sporozoites attaches to a dog, and feeds on its blood, releasing many sporozoites into the dog's bloodstream. Each sporozoite attaches to a red blood cell, and moves inside the cell. Once inside the cell, the sporozoite loses its outer coating. It divides, becoming a new form, known as a merozoite. Inside the tick, the merozoite undergoes sexual reproduction (gamogony), which is followed by asexual reproduction, resulting in many sporozoites. These are found in the tick salivary glands, and they move from there into the next dog on which the tick feeds. Pregnant dogs can transmit B. canis to their unborn puppies, so infected females should not be bred.

== Symptoms, diagnosis, and treatment ==
The clinical signs of B. canis infection are lethargy, weakness, vomiting, anorexia, fever, pale mucous membranes, and dark discoloration of the urine. Other symptoms may present, including neurological and respiratory signs.

B. canis is not easy to diagnose on a blood smear, since the chance of finding the parasite is low, due to its small size. Taking blood from a capillary source (such as a fresh cut) rather than from a blood vessel increases the chances of finding the organism. Polymerase chain reaction testing is a more accurate diagnostic method.

B. canis infection in dogs usually responds to treatment with imidocarb dipropionate, although the infection may not be eliminated and dogs can become permanent carriers. In dogs infected with B. canis, splenectomy (removal of the spleen) or any immunosuppressive drug should be avoided; otherwise, signs of babesiosis may recur.

== Prevention ==
Vaccines to prevent B. canis are not available in North America, but in France, a vaccine is available, although it only seems effective against certain strains. The best prevention is tick control, or prompt removal of ticks from the dog. The spread of B. canis by blood donation can be prevented by screening potential donor dogs for B. canis infection prior to their donation.

== See also ==
- Biliary fever
