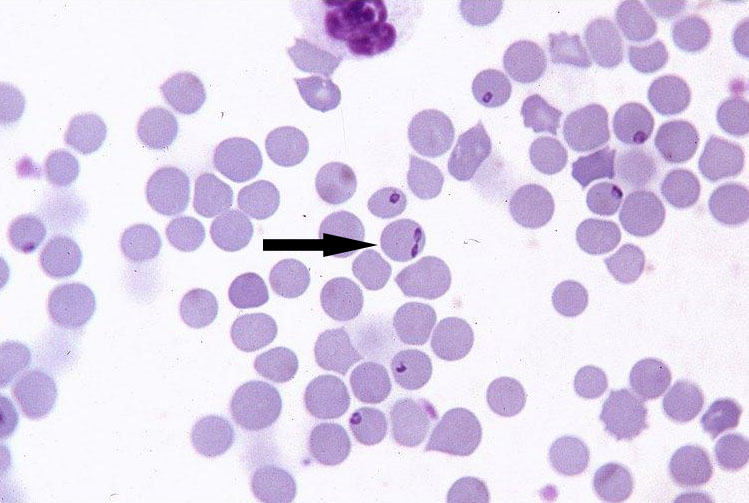

Scientific classification
- Domain: Eukaryota
- Clade: Sar
- Clade: Alveolata
- Phylum: Apicomplexa
- Class: Aconoidasida
- Order: Piroplasmida
- Family: Babesiidae
- Genus: Babesia
- Species: B. divergens

Binomial name
- Babesia divergens M'Fadyean & Stockman, 1911

= Babesia divergens =

Species of single-celled organism

Babesia divergens is an intraerythrocytic parasite, transmitted by the tick Ixodes ricinus. It is the most common cause of human babesiosis. It is the main agent of bovine babesiosis, or "redwater fever", in Europe. Young cattle are less susceptible. The current emphasis in Europe on sustainable agriculture and extensification is likely to lead to an increase in vector tick populations with an increased risk of infection. B. divergens is also prevalent (infection rates of 11-23%) in cottontail rabbits on Nantucket Island, Massachusetts, USA.

Human infections are rare. The most severe, life-threatening infections were described in asplenic patients. Infections in immunocompetent patients were also observed, and described as a "serious influenza-like" syndrome that requires medical treatment.
