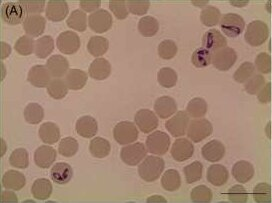
- Babesia caballi in vitro culture

Scientific classification
- Domain: Eukaryota
- Clade: Diaphoretickes
- Clade: SAR
- Clade: Alveolata
- Phylum: Apicomplexa
- Class: Aconoidasida
- Order: Piroplasmida
- Family: Babesiidae
- Genus: Babesia
- Species: B. caballi

Binomial name
- Babesia caballi (Nuttall & Strickland, 1910)

= Babesia caballi =

Species of single-celled organism

Babesia caballi is a species belonging to Alveolata and the family Babesiidae. In horses, it causes the babesiosis disease, called "equine babesiosis". Its length is 2.5-5 μm, while its width is 2 μm. It is usually oval-shaped. Its vector and second feeders are ticks. In North America B. caballi is being spread by Dermacentor nitens.

== Bibliography ==
- Furmaga, Stanisław (1983). Choroby pasożytnicze zwierząt domowych. Warsaw: Państwowe Wydawnictwo Rolnicze i Leśne. ISBN 978-83-09-00671-8.
- Griffiths, Henry Joseph (1978). A handbook of veterinary parasitology : domestic animals of North America. Minneapolis: University of Minnesota Press. ISBN 978-0-8166-0828-7.
