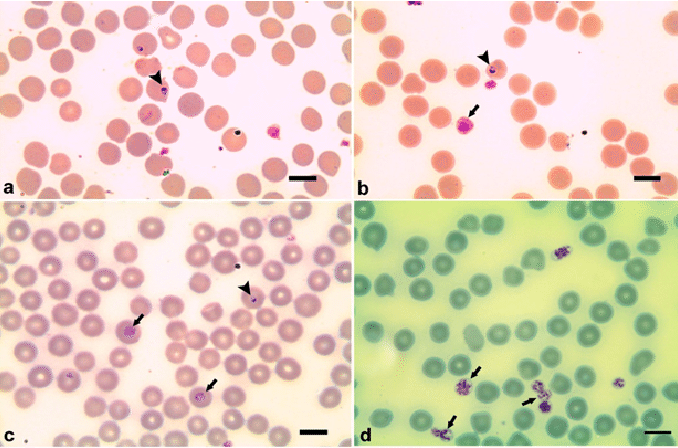
- Intracellular stages of a Babesia motasi infection

Scientific classification
- Domain: Eukaryota
- Clade: Sar
- Clade: Alveolata
- Phylum: Apicomplexa
- Class: Aconoidasida
- Order: Piroplasmida
- Family: Babesiidae
- Genus: Babesia
- Species: B. motasi

Binomial name
- Babesia motasi Wenyon, 1926

= Babesia motasi =

Species of single-celled organism

Babesia motasi is a species belonging to Alveolata and the family Babesiidae. In sheep causes babesiosis disease, called "sheep babesiosis". At a length of 2.5-5 μm, Babesia motasi is relatively large for a species of protozoa. Morphologically, the parasites are usually pear-shaped. B. motasi is rarely found in erythrocytes.

Babesia motasi has been known to cause babesiosis in humans.

== Bibliography ==
- Furmaga, Stanisław (1983). Choroby pasożytnicze zwierząt domowych. Warsaw: Państwowe Wydawnictwo Rolnicze i Leśne. ISBN 83-09-00671-3.
- Cąkała, S. (1981). Choroby owiec. Warsaw: Państwowe Wydawnictwo Rolnicze i Leśne. p. 328. ISBN 83-09-00473-7.
