= Cardiosporidium =

Scientific classification
- Domain: Eukaryota
- Supergroup: Alveolata
- Phylum: Apicomplexa
- Class: Aconoidasida
- Order: Achromatorida
- Family: Haemohormidiidae
- Genus: Cardiosporidium; Gaver & Stephan, 1907

Species
- Cardiosporidium cionae

Genus of single-celled organisms

Cardiosporidium is a genus of parasitic alveolates in the phylum Apicomplexa. It infects the ascidian Ciona intestinalis.

== History ==
This genus was first described by Van Gaver and Stephan in 1907. It was redescribed by Ciancio et al in 2008.

== Taxonomy ==
There is one known species in this genus: Cardiosporidium cionae. It appears to be related to the genera Babesia, Cytauxzoon and Theileria.

== Description ==
The parasite infects the pericardial body of the host. Like other members of this phylum it possesses apicoplasts, rhoptry and subpellicular microtubules. This Apicomplexan parasite is occasionally itself "parasitised" by an alphaproteobacteria from the order Rickettsiales. The symbiont is termed a "parasite" only as a shorthand convenience. Technically speaking, it may actually act more as a mutualist-symbiont or a commensal-symbiont rather than a parasitic-symbiont. It synthesizes the essential metabolites lysine and lipoic acid, which likely benefits the holobiont: These apicomplexan hosts bearing this endo-symbiotic bacterium may benefit from the supply of extra nutrients. A similar apicomplexan from the genus Nephromyces has also been described. They are found in Narraganset Bay Rhode Island and in the Gulf of Naples.
