= Cytauxzoonosis =

Scientific classification
- Domain: Eukaryota
- Clade: Diaphoretickes
- Clade: SAR
- Clade: Alveolata
- Phylum: Apicomplexa
- Class: Aconoidasida
- Order: Piroplasmida
- Family: Theileriidae
- Genus: Cytauxzoon
- Species: C. felis

Binomial name
- Cytauxzoon felis (Kier)

Synonyms
- Theileria felis

Species of protozoan

Cytauxzoon felis is a protozoal organism transmitted to domestic cats by tick bites, and whose natural reservoir host is the bobcat. C. felis has been found in other wild felid species such as the cougar, as well as a white tiger in captivity. C. felis infection is limited to the family Felidae which means that C. felis poses no zoonotic (transmission to humans) risk or agricultural (transmission to farm animals) risk. Until recently it was believed that after infection with C. felis, pet cats almost always died. As awareness of C. felis has increased it has been found that treatment is not always futile. More cats have been shown to survive the infection than was previously thought. New treatments offer as much as 60% survival rate.

== Terminology ==
Cytauxzoon felis belongs to the order Piroplasmida and the family Theileriidae. C. felis is related to Theileria spp. of African ungulates. It is not a bacterium, not a virus, and not a fungus, but is instead a protozoan that infects the blood cells of cats.

== Epidemiology ==
The first case of C. felis was documented in Missouri in 1976, and in the past it was believed to be limited to south central and southeastern United States. There have been more cases popping up in the mid-Atlantic region in the United States, and even as far north as Pennsylvania and North Dakota in bobcats. There has not been any age or sex predilection made, but intact animals have shown more prevalence in some studies; in particular intact males. In studies it is unclear if the sex predilection is due to the increased roaming of intact animals or another reason. The most common seasons for the disease to become apparent are spring and summer and appear to affect outdoor cats the most often. The reason that outdoor cats get infected more is due to the increased exposure to ticks. Ticks are also active in spring and summer.

== Symptoms and signs ==
Most infected cats have been healthy before a very sudden onset of severe disease. The course of clinical disease is often swift with clinical signs of lethargy and inappetence within 5 to 20 days after the tick bite. Cats develop a high fever, but the temperature may become low before death. Other clinical findings can be: dehydration, icterus (jaundice), enlarged liver and spleen, lymphadenopathy, pale mucous membranes, respiratory distress, tachycardia or bradycardia, and tick infestation (although ticks are not often found on infected cats since cats typically groom ticks off their fur). Signs of disease seen on blood work include hemolytic anemia, thrombocytopenia, increased or decreased white blood cell numbers, icterus, and elevated liver enzymes. Death usually follows the onset of clinical signs within a few days. However, more recent studies show not all cats develop clinical signs after infection, and some cats survive the infection.

== Life cycle and transmission ==
The life cycle for Cytauxzoon felis has not been completely described. Bobcats become persistent carriers of the organism after they develop mild or subclinical infection and then serve as the reservoir host. C. felis is transmitted by the Lone star tick (Amblyomma americanum) that feeds on an infected bobcat then transmits the organism to another bobcat, or to a pet cat. Many other types of ticks may feed on the cats, but the only other tick that has been shown to transmit the organism is the American dog tick (Dermacentor variabilis) but only in a research setting. In the past, domestic cats were thought to always die from infection so they were considered terminal hosts or "dead end hosts". Now there have been documented cases of cats that get sick and survive the infection and even those that never show clinical signs at all. Cats cannot catch the infection from another cat directly without being bitten by a tick.

The life cycle of the protozoa has a tissue phase and an erythrocytic (red blood cell) phase. The organism goes through asexual reproduction phase that is called schizogony which occurs in the mononuclear phagocytic cells. In the tissue phase, the macrophage cells that are infected often clog venules in organs such as the liver, spleen, lungs, and lymph nodes. It is this phase that is associated with clinical disease if the schizonts are numerous. Schizonts next form merozoites that break out of the macrophage cells and infect the red blood cells (erythrocytes). The erythrocytic disease is not as important for clinical disease, but is often used to diagnose C. felis because piroplasms (erythrocytes that have phagocytized merozoites) can be seen on a peripheral blood smear under the microscope.

It is not clear why some cats become clinically affected with C. felis while others never show any signs. There are speculations about resistance in some cats, and speculations about different strains of C. felis with differing virulence. There is not enough information to prove any of these theories, but cats in the same household or same regions can have drastically different clinical presentations. Some studies even show multi-cat households have had one cat die and another be persistently infected. When cats survive infection they have persistent parasitemia which shows up in the blood as piroplasms, but these cats do not have the tissue phase again and therefore do not again show the clinical illness.

== Diagnosis ==
One way to diagnose C. felis is by taking blood and performing a peripheral blood smear to look for the erythrocytic piroplasms. The erythrocytic piroplasms are usually shaped like signet rings and are 1 to 1.5 μm. Not all cats that are infected will have the piroplasms on their blood smear, especially if they are early in disease course. Another method of diagnosing infection in sick cats is to take needle aspirates of affected organs and find the schizonts inside mononuclear cells in the tissues; examination of tissue is also useful for the diagnosis after cats have died. Blood samples can be sent away for polymerase chain reaction (PCR) testing to confirm infection. Other diseases that might resemble cytauxzoonosis should be ruled out. A major rule-out for C. felis is Mycoplasma haemofelis (formerly known as Haemobartonella felis); clinical signs can be similar to cytauxzoonosis and the organism may be confused on the peripheral smear. Because it causes similar signs in outdoor cats during the spring and summer, tularemia is another disease the veterinarian may want to rule out.

Other laboratory tests are often abnormal in sick cats. The CBC of an infected cat often shows a pancytopenia, or a decrease in red blood cells, white blood cells, and platelets; in some cases there is not a decrease in all three values. Clotting tests may be prolonged. Increased liver enzymes are common, and electrolyte disturbances, hyperglycemia, and acid-base disturbances can also be observed.

== Treatment and prevention ==
The preventative measure of keeping cats inside in areas with high infection rates can prevent infection. Approved tick treatments for cats can be used but have been shown not to fully prevent tick bites.

The most often used treatments for cytauxzoonosis are imidocarb dipropionate and a combination of atovaquone and azithromycin. Although imidocarb has been used for years, it is not particularly effective. In a large study, only 25% of cats treated with this drug and supportive care survived. 60% of sick cats treated with supportive care and the combination of the anti-malarial drug atovaquone and the antibiotic azithromycin survived infection.

Quick referral to a veterinarian equipped to treat the disease may be beneficial. All infected cats require supportive care, including careful fluids, nutritional support, treatment for complications, and often blood transfusion.

Cats that survive the infection should be kept indoors as they can be persistent carriers after surviving infection and might indirectly infect other cats after being themselves bitten by a vector tick.
