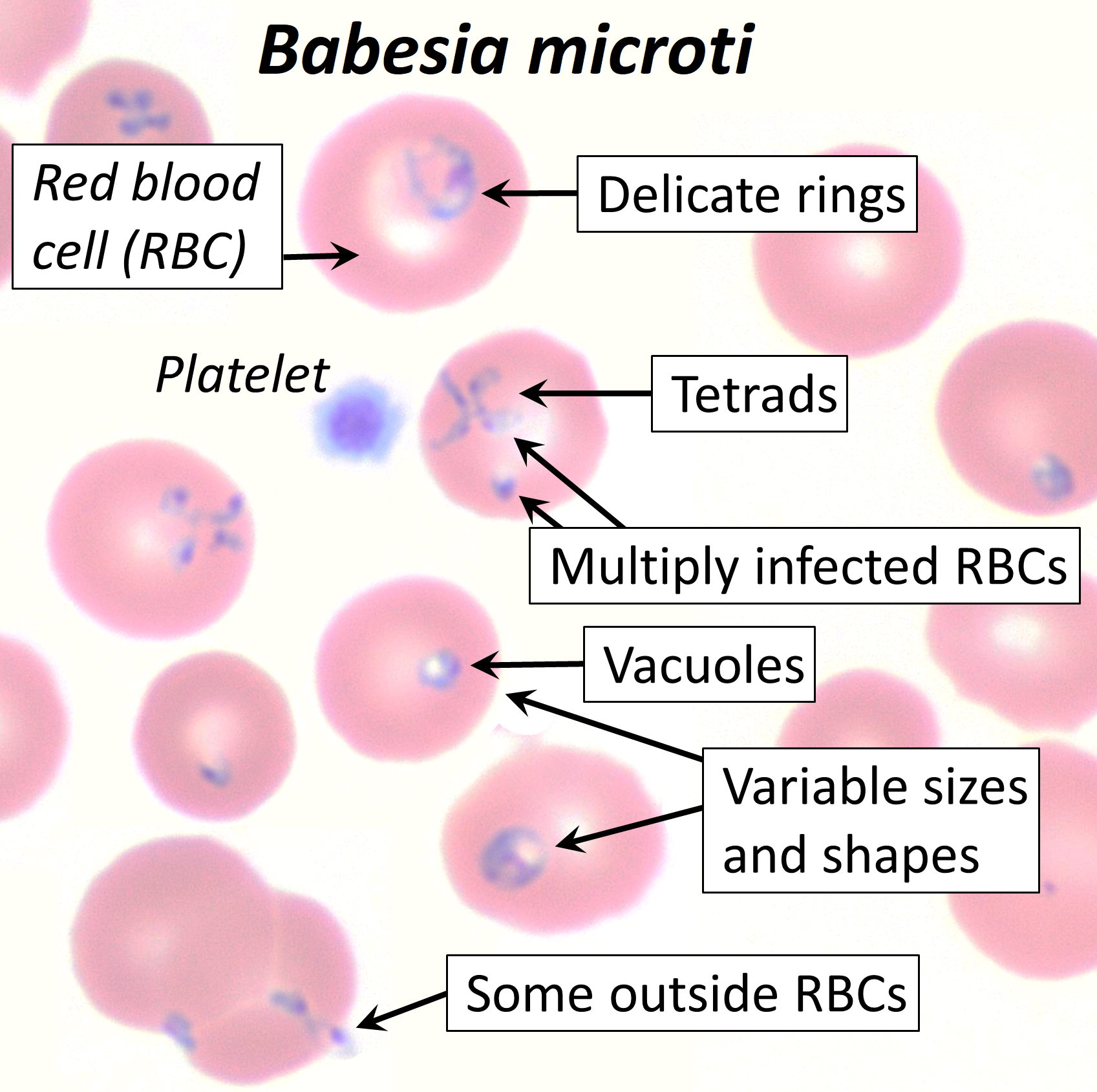

Scientific classification
- Domain: Eukaryota
- Clade: Sar
- Superphylum: Alveolata
- Phylum: Apicomplexa
- Class: Aconoidasida
- Order: Piroplasmida
- Family: Babesiidae
- Genus: Babesia
- Species: B. microti

Binomial name
- Babesia microti (França, 1912)

= Babesia microti =

Species of parasitic protist in the Apicomplexa phylum

Life cycle of B. microti, including human infection

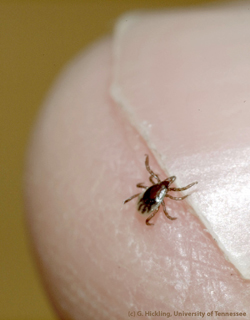
Typically, B. microti is transmitted by the nymphal stage of Ixodes scapularis ticks (about the size of a poppy seed).

Babesia microti is a parasitic blood-borne piroplasm transmitted by deer ticks. B. microti is responsible for the disease babesiosis, a malaria-like zoonosis which causes fever, hemolytic anemia caused by hemolysis, and enlarged spleen.

== Lifecycle ==
The lifecycle of B. microti includes two hosts: a vertebrate and an arthropod, the deer tick. When the tick bites a vertebrate, B. microti can be transmitted as sporozoites into the vertebrate host. The parasite starts infecting red blood cells, where it digests hemoglobin for amino acids. After this, B. microti undergoes asexual reproduction and differentiation to male and female gametocytes. These are then ingested by the arthropod host and B. microti gametes undergo a sporogonic cycle (sexual reproduction), where new sporozoites are made. The cycle begins again when the tick bites a new vertebrate host.

B. microti's usual vertebrate hosts include domesticated animals, such as cattle, dogs, and rats, and wild animals. Humans are accidental hosts of Babesia in general, but B. microti is an important transfusion-transmitted infectious organism in humans. Between 2010 and 2014, it caused four out of 15 (27%) fatalities associated with transfusion-transmitted microbial infections reported to the US FDA (the highest of any single organism). In 2018, the FDA approved an antibody-based screening test for blood and organ donors.

An important difference from malaria is that B. microti does not infect liver cells or require haem iron for their metabolical processes. Additionally, the piroplasm is spread by tick bites (Ixodes scapularis, the same tick that spreads Lyme disease), while the malaria protozoans are spread by mosquitoes. Finally, under the microscope, the merozoite form of the B. microti lifecycle in red blood cells forms a cross-shaped structure, often referred to as a "Maltese cross" or tetrad, in addition to intracellular "ring forms", which are also seen in the malaria parasite (Plasmodium spp.).

== Taxonomy ==
Piroplasmida phylogeny (mtDNA)

- Piroplasmida
  - - - - Babesia s.s.
        - Theileriidae
          - Theileria s.s.
          - Cytauxzoon
      - Theileria equi
    - Babesia conradae
  - Babesia microti

Until 2006, B. microti was thought to belong to the genus Babesia, as Babesia microti, until ribosomal RNA comparisons placed it in the sister genus Theileria. As of 2012, the medical community still classified the parasite as B. microti though its genome showed it does not belong to either Babesia or Theileria.

== Genomics ==
The genome of Babesia microti has been sequenced and published.

The mitochondrial genome is circular.

== Vaccine ==
In May 2010, a vaccine to protect cattle against East Coast fever reportedly had been approved and registered by the governments of Kenya, Malawi, and Tanzania.

A vaccine to protect humans has yet to be approved.
