= Babesia sp. 'North Carolina dog' =

Scientific classification
- Domain: Eukaryota
- Clade: Sar
- Clade: Alveolata
- Phylum: Apicomplexa
- Class: Aconoidasida
- Order: Piroplasmida
- Family: Babesiidae
- Genus: Babesia
- Species: B. sp. 'North Carolina dog'

Binomial name
- Babesia sp. 'North Carolina dog'

Species of single-celled organism

Babesia sp. 'North Carolina dog' is an unclassified species of Babesia, identified from a 18S ribosomal gene partial sequence performed in the investigation of dog piroplasms.

Unlike the other piroplasms investigated, the piroplasm is "in a distinct phylogenetic clade, closely related to babesial isolates from wildlife and humans from the Western US".
