= Progarnia archosauriae =

Scientific classification
- Domain: Eukaryota
- Clade: Sar
- Clade: Alveolata
- Phylum: Apicomplexa
- Class: Aconoidasida
- Order: Haemospororida
- Family: Garniidae
- Genus: Progarnia
- Species: P. archosauriae

Binomial name
- Progarnia archosauriae Lainson, 1995

Species of blood parasite

Progarnia archosauriae is a blood parasite belonging to the phylum Apicomplexa, family Garniidae. It was first described in the spectacled caiman (Caiman crocodilus crocodilus), a member of Archosauria: Crocodilia. The parasite undergoes merogony and gametogony primarily in leukocytes and thrombocytes, occasionally invading erythrocytes without producing malarial pigment. Its characteristics suggest evolutionary links between reptilian and avian haemosporines.
