= Theileriosis =

Theileriosis may refer to:

- East Coast fever, a disease of cattle, sheep, and goats caused by the protozoan parasite Theileria parva
- Human theileriosis, caused by Theileria microti
- Tropical theileriosis, a theileriosis of cattle from the Mediterranean and Middle East area, from Morocco to Western parts of India and China, caused by Theileria annulata

== See also ==
- Theileria, the genus of parasitic protozoan which causes theileriosis
