= Fallisia siamense =

Scientific classification
- Domain: Eukaryota
- Clade: Sar
- Clade: Alveolata
- Phylum: Apicomplexa
- Class: Aconoidasida
- Order: Haemospororida
- Family: Garniidae
- Genus: Fallisia
- Species: F. siamense

Binomial name
- Fallisia siamense Telford, 1986

Species of single-celled organism

Fallisia siamense is a parasite in the family Garniidae.

== Description ==
The parasite was first described by Telford in 1986.

== Geographical occurrence ==
This species is found in Thailand.

== Vectors ==
Not known.

== Clinical features and host pathology ==
The only known host for this species is the flying lizard Draco maculatus.
