= Sauroplasma =

Scientific classification
- Domain: Eukaryota
- Clade: Sar
- Clade: Alveolata
- Phylum: Apicomplexa
- Class: Aconoidasida
- Order: Achromatorida
- Genus: Sauroplasma

Species
- Sauroplasma boreale Sauroplasma thomasi

Genus of single-celled organisms

Sauroplasma is a genus of parasites of the phylum Apicomplexa.

Species in this genus have two hosts (a vertebrate and an invertebrate) in their life cycle: for species in this genus the vertebrate host are lizards. The vectors are not known but ticks have been suggested as possible hosts.

The type species is Sauroplasma thomasi.

== Taxonomic History ==
This genus was created in 1937 by P.J. du Toit for the newly described species Sauroplasma thomasi, a parasite of the giant girdle-tailed lizard (Zonurus giganteus). He considered the genus a member of the sporozoan family Piroplasmidae (Babesidae). More recent placements include Apicomplexan family Haemohormidiidae or order Piroplasmorida

== Description ==
To date this species has been described from erythrocytes only.

The parasites are amoeboid but frequently adopt a ring shape.

A vacuole is present and occasionally one or more pigment granules.

Schizogony is absent.

Binary fission or budding into two daughter cells occurs.

== Host records ==
- S. boreale - sand lizard (Lacerta agilis)
- S. thomasi - great girdled lizard (Zonurus giganteus)

Unknown species

- Jamaican iguana (Cyclura collei)
- Grand Cayman iguana (Cyclura lewisi)
- Cuban rock iguana (Cyclura nubila)
- leaf-tailed gecko (Uroplatus fimbriatus)
