= Tunetella =

Scientific classification
- Domain: Eukaryota
- Clade: Sar
- Clade: Alveolata
- Phylum: Apicomplexa
- Class: Aconoidasida
- Order: Piroplasmida
- Family: Babesiidae
- Genus: Tunetella

Species
- Tunetella emydis

Genus of single-celled organisms

Tunetella is a genus of parasites of the phylum Apicomplexa.

There is one species in this genus — Tunetella emydis.

== History ==
The species and genus was described by Brumpt and Lavier in 1935.

== Description ==
This species infects the erythrocytes of tortoise Emys leprosa.
