= Rhabdospora =

Scientific classification
- Domain: Eukaryota
- Clade: Sar
- Superphylum: Alveolata
- Phylum: Apicomplexa
- Class: Aconoidasida
- Order: Achromatorida
- Family: Haemohormidiidae
- Genus: Rhabdospora; Laguesse, 1895

Species
- Rhabdospora thelohani

Genus of eukaryotes

Rhabdospora is a genus assigned to cells found in a variety of fish. First reported in 1892, there has since been disagreement over whether Rhabdospora represents a parasite of the phylum Apicomplexa or a specialized fish cell.

== History ==
In 1892, Thélohan described unusual looking cells from the intestine of various fishes. In 1895, Laguessé named these cells Rhabdospora thelohani or "rodlet cells", determining them to be parasites that infect the fish. Since then, there has been disagreement over whether R. thelohani is an Apicomplexan parasite or a specialized intestinal fish cell.

== Host records ==
- Spirlin (Alburnoides bipunctatus ohridanus)
- Antarctic snaggletooth (Borostomias antarcticus)
- European chub (Leuciscus cephalus albus)
- Minnow (Phoxinus phoxinus)
- South European roach (Rutilus rubilio)
- Three-spined stickleback (Gasterosteus aculeatus)
