= Nicollia =

Nicollia may refer to:

- Nicollia, a genus of nematodes in the family Nicollinidae, synonym of Nicollina
- Nicollia, a genus of protists in the family Babesiidae, synonym of Babesia
