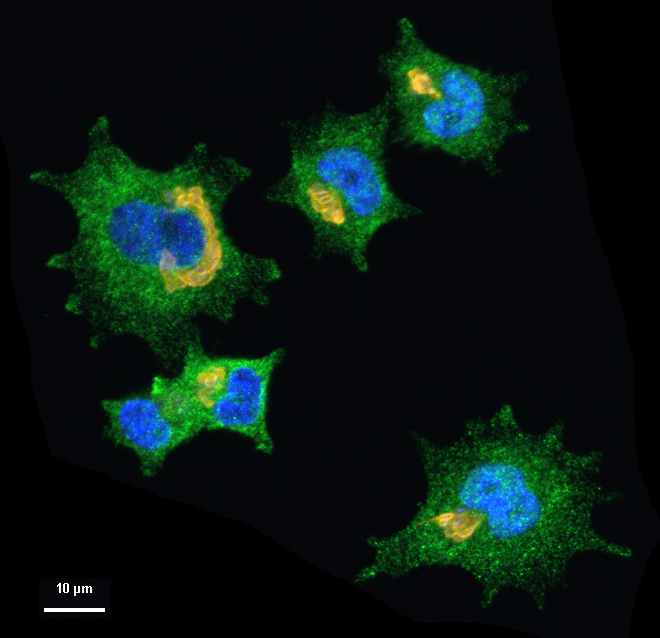
- Bovine macrophages infected with Theileria annulata (yellow)

Scientific classification
- Domain: Eukaryota
- Clade: Sar
- Clade: Alveolata
- Phylum: Apicomplexa
- Class: Aconoidasida
- Order: Piroplasmida
- Family: Theileriidae
- Genus: Theileria
- Species: T. annulata

Binomial name
- Theileria annulata

= Tropical theileriosis =

Tick-borne disease of cattle

Tropical theileriosis or Mediterranean theileriosis is a theileriosis of cattle from the Mediterranean and Middle East area, from Morocco to Western parts of India and China. It is a tick-borne disease, caused by Theileria annulata. The vectors are ticks of the genera Hyalomma and Rhipicephalus.

The most prominent symptoms are fever and lymph node enlargement. But there is a wide range of clinical manifestations, especially in enzootic areas. Among them, the Doukkala area of Morocco, where the epidemiology and symptomatology of the disease were minutely studied.

The disease was once considered as "benign" in the literature, in comparison to East Coast fever. With the introduction of European breeds into the region, however, it could become of major economic incidence. An efficient treatment with parvaquone, then buparvaquone became available in many countries from the mid-1990s. Animals native to endemic areas appear more tolerant to the disease, buffalos especially, appear less susceptible.

== Clinical signs ==
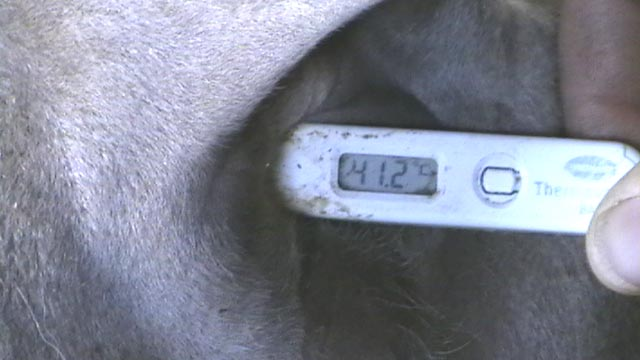
A high temperature (41.2 °C (106.2 °F)) is a common feature in acute cases.

Body temperature is regularly higher than in any other cattle disease. Fever from 41 to 42 °C (106 to 108 °F) is common in acute stages. Later on (day 5 to day 10 from the clinical onset), temperature will lower to a normal range (38.0–39.5 °C (100.4–103.1 °F)), but the disease will continue to progress, despite a possible apparent clinical improvement (appetite comes back). Afterwards, from D10 to D15, there is a downfall stage, with hypothermia (37 to 38 °C (99 to 100 °F)), anemia, jaundice, and heart failure. Such animals rarely recover, even with intensive treatment.

Lymph nodes are commonly enlarged and there may be episodes of blood from the nose, difficulty breathing and weight loss.

Other signs, but not present in all cases are:

- Blood-tinged diarrhea, or with obvious blood clots.
- Bruxism (grinding of teeth) can be seen
- Circular raised patches of hair all over the body
- Haemorrhages in the ocular and vaginal mucous membranes
- A degree of anaemia

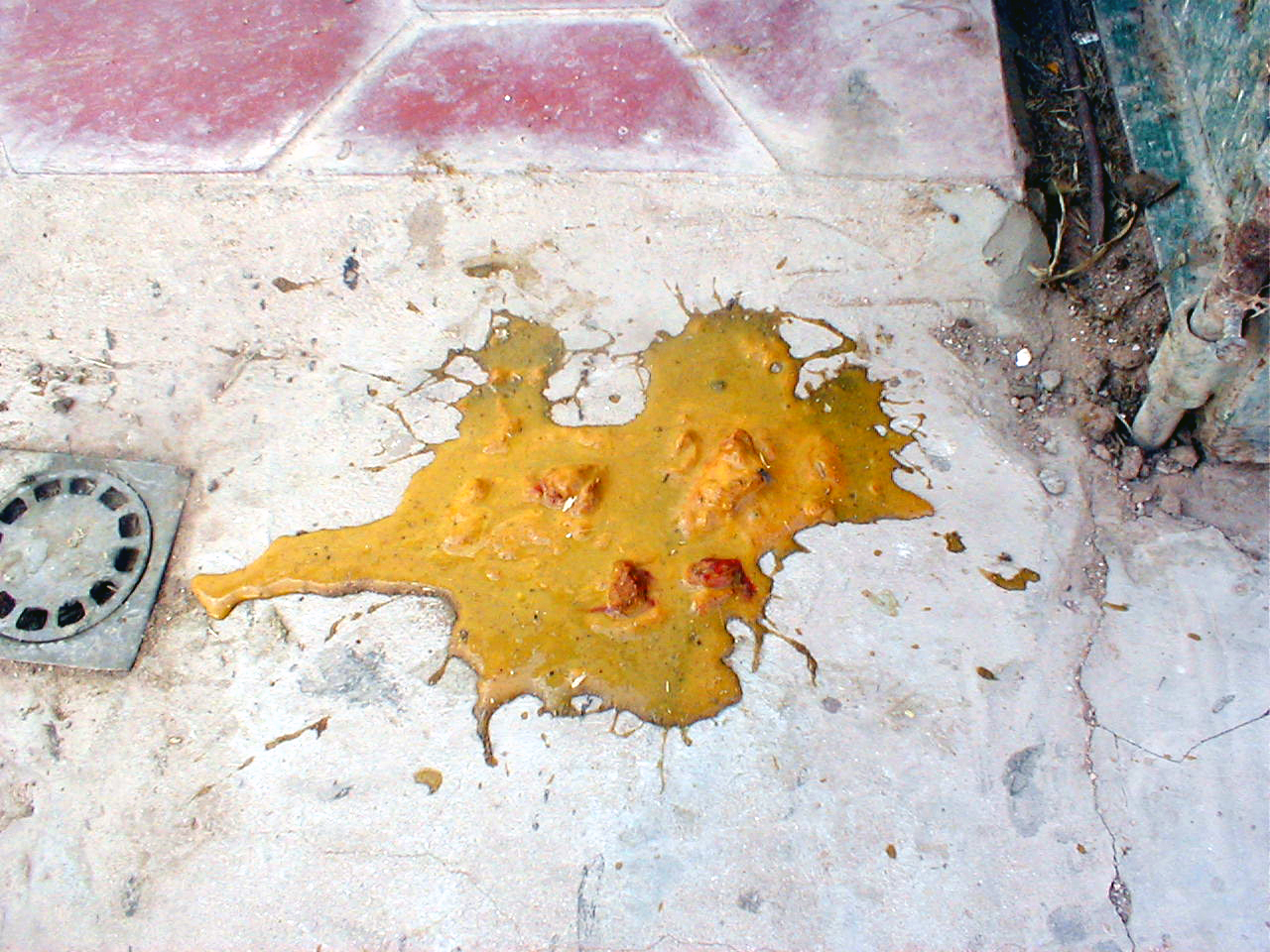
Diarrhea with blood clots in a calf

== Diagnosis ==
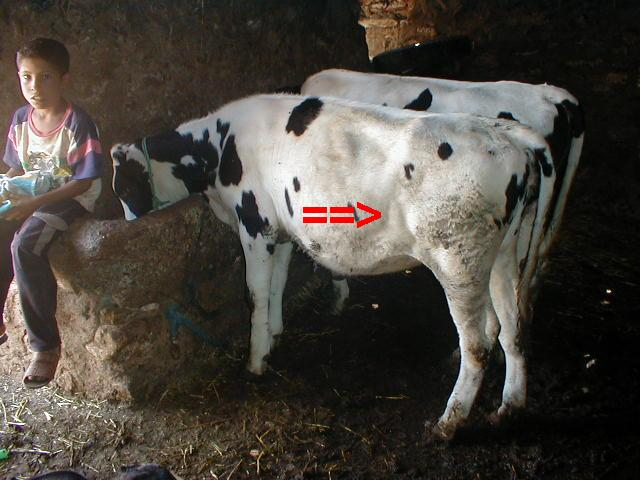
Lymph node enlargement in six-months-old calves in asymptomatic infestation

Lymph node enlargement and even hyperthermia can occur asymptomatically in enzootic area, during the disease season.

Clinical signs, including lymph node enlargement, anaemia, hyperthermia and history of tick infestation can lead to a suspicion of theileriosis

Definitive diagnosis relies on the observation of the pirolplasm stages of the organism in the erythrocytes in blood smears stained with Romanowsky stains. Lymph node aspirates can also be examined for the presence of 'Kock's Blue Bodies' which are schizont stages in lymphocytes. Necropsy reveals 'punched out ulcers' in the abomasum and greyish raised 'infarcts' on the kidneys. Numerous serological tests like ELISA, and indirect immunofluorescence test and PCR can also help diagnosis.

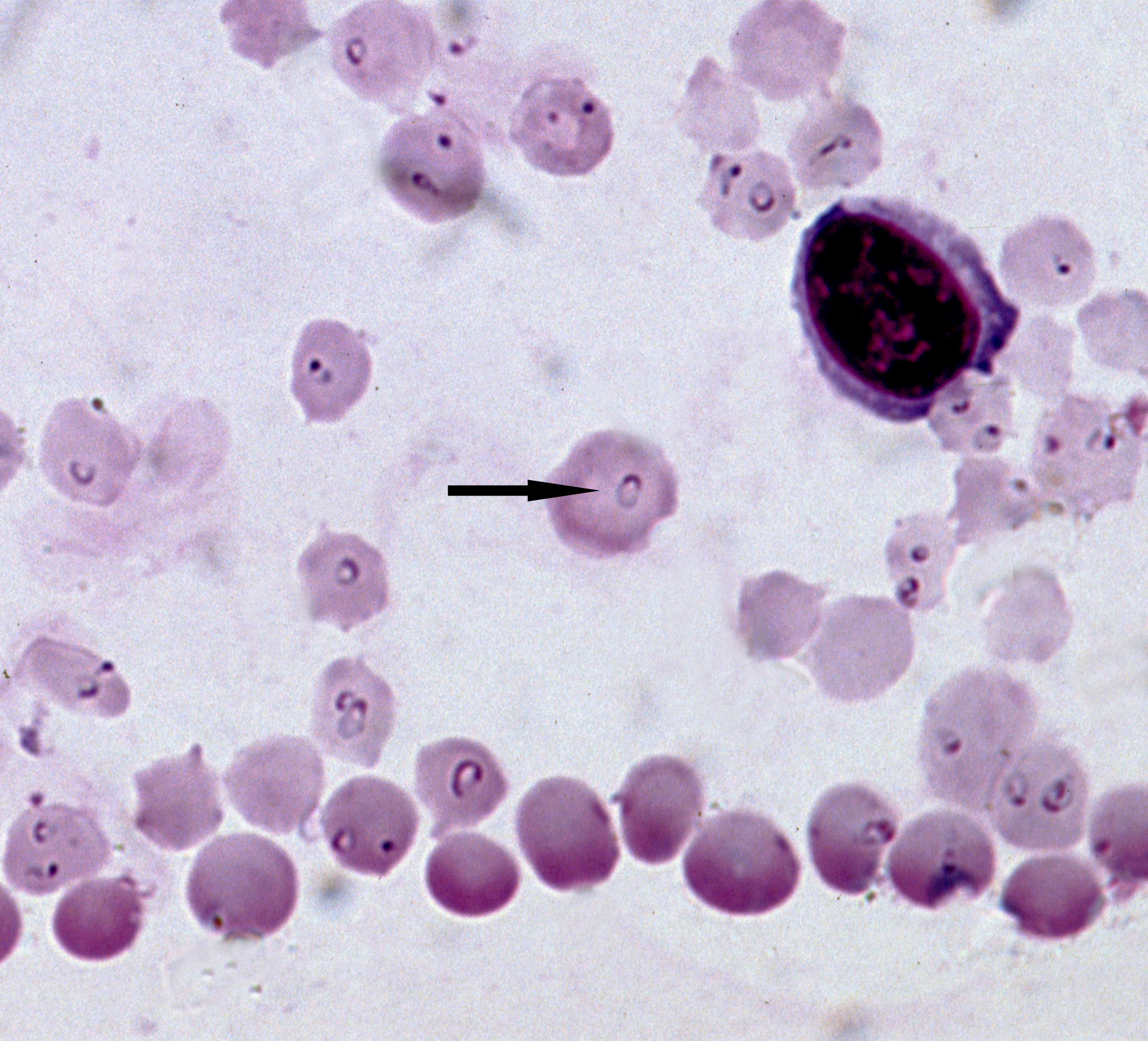
Theileria-annulata-piroplasms-cattle

== Treatment and control ==
Buparvaquone, halofuginone and tetracycline and butalex and oxytetracycline have all shown to be effective. Tick control should be considered, but resistance to parasiticide products may be increasing. There are various options for controlling ticks of domestic animals, including: topical application of parasiticidal chemicals in dip baths or spray races or pour-on formulations, spraying parasiticides on walls of cattle pens, and rendering the walls of cattle pens smooth with mortar to stop ticks molting there. Selection of cattle for good ability to acquire immune resistance to ticks is potentially effective.

Endemic stability is a state where animals are affected at a low levels or not as susceptible to the disease, and this may be encouraged in endemic areas.

Vaccination is available and should be performed in breeds that are susceptible to infection.

Live attenuated vaccine are being used in many countries like India, Iran, Turkey etc. Which is a basically a Lymphocyte infected with T. annulata schizont stage and passaged for attenuation.

== Microbiology ==
Theileria annulata is an apicomplexan parasite that is transmitted via ticks of the genus Hyalomma and infects leukocytes (specifically macrophages, dendritic cells, and B cells) of large ruminants, including cattle. The infected leukocytes exhibit rapid uncontrolled proliferation due to their gene expression being altered by the intracellular macroschizont stage of the parasite. The macroschizont stage divides and is passed on to both daughter cells upon cell division of the host leukocytes. The macroschizont is multinucleated and eventually divides into multiple uninucleated merozoites that are released when the cell ruptures. The merozoites then invade erythrocytes and form the piroplasm stage. These infected erythrocytes are then taken up by a tick vector when sucking blood.

The parasite sexually reproduces in the tick midgut via production and subsequent fusion of micro- and macrogametes. The resulting zygote then invades midgut cells and undergoes meiosis, eventually releasing a large number of primary kinetes into the hemolymph. The primary kinetes then invade the tick salivary glands and form a sporont, a polymorphous syncytium. The sporont then develops into a sporoblast that remains dormant during the molting of the tick. When the tick attaches to a host the sporoblast becomes active and sporozoites are released into the tick saliva which then infect host leukocytes.

The phenotypes of the leukocytes that are induced by T. annulata have some hallmarks of cancer, including immortalization, hyperproliferation, and dissemination.

== Vectors ==
Hyalomma marginatum marginatum is by far the most common vector in the Extremadura region of Spain. The Habela team investigated several locations across the 1990s and collected their analysis in Habela et al 1999. They found Hmm very prevalently but also commonly found Rhipicephalus bursa, and Rb is most common in cattle and cattle suffer the worst. H. lusitanicum and R. sanguineus are rare.

== Range ==
This is the most impactful tick-borne disease in the Extremadura Region of Spain. The Habela team found Mediterranean theileriosis consistently in several studies throughout the 1990s, collected in their Habela et al 1999.
