= Entopolypoides =

Scientific classification
- Domain: Eukaryota
- Clade: Diaphoretickes
- Clade: SAR
- Clade: Alveolata
- Phylum: Apicomplexa
- Class: Aconoidasida
- Order: Piroplasmida
- Family: Babesiidae
- Genus: Entopolypoides; Mayer, 1933

Species
- Entopolypoides macaci

Genus of single-celled organisms

Entopolypoides is a genus of parasites belonging to the phylum Apicomplexa.

== History ==
The type species (Entopolypoides macaci) was described by Mayer in 1934 in a Macaca irus monkey from Java.

== Description ==
Young parasites are delicate rings with a large vacuole but the more mature parasites have several fine long processes.

After three days in the erythrocyte the parasite divides into four. There is no synchronicity of division.

== Host range ==
- vervet monkeys (Cercopithecus aethiops pygerythrus)
- Syke's monkeys (Cercopithecus mitis)
- long tailed macaques (Macaca fascicularis)
- macaque (Macaca irus)
- yellow baboon (Papio cynocephalus)

== Note ==
The genus Entopolypoides may be synonymous with that of Babesia. Further work in this area will be need to clarify this.
