= Garnia =

Garnia may refer to:

- Garnia (alveolate), a genus of parasitic protozoa belonging to the family Garniidae
- Garnia (weevil), a genus of beetle belonging to the tribe Apostasimerini
