= Serpentoplasma =

Scientific classification
- Domain: Eukaryota
- Clade: Sar
- Clade: Alveolata
- Phylum: Apicomplexa
- Class: Aconoidasida
- Order: Achromatorida
- Family: Haemohormidiidae
- Genus: Serpentoplasma; Pienaar, 1962

Genus of single-celled organisms

Serpentoplasma is a genus of parasitic alveolates belonging the phylum Apicomplexa. The genus was described in 1962 by Pienaar. The species in this genus infect snakes.
