= Trophosphaera =

Scientific classification
- Domain: Eukaryota
- Clade: Sar
- Superphylum: Alveolata
- Phylum: Apicomplexa
- Class: Aconoidasida
- Order: Achromatorida
- Family: Haemohormidiidae
- Genus: Trophosphaera; Le Calvez, 1939
- Species: T. planorbulinae

Binomial name
- Trophosphaera planorbulinae Le Calvez, 1939

Genus of single-celled organisms

Trophosphaera is a genus of parasites of the phylum Apicomplexa.

Only one species (Trophosphaera planorbulinae) is known for this genus.

== History ==
This genus was described in 1939 by Le Calvez.

== Host records ==
Elphidium crispum
