= Borostomias panamensis =

Conservation status
- Least Concern (IUCN 3.1)

Scientific classification
- Kingdom: Animalia
- Phylum: Chordata
- Class: Actinopterygii
- Order: Stomiiformes
- Family: Stomiidae
- Genus: Borostomias
- Species: B. panamensis

Binomial name
- Borostomias panamensis Regan & Trewavas, 1929

Species of fish

Borostomias panamensis is a species of fish in the family Stomiidae. The species has been documented in the Pacific Ocean near Chile, and adults can reach a maximum length of ~30 centimeters.
