= Dobellia =

Scientific classification
- Domain: Eukaryota
- (unranked): SAR
- (unranked): Alveolata
- Phylum: Apicomplexa
- Class: Aconoidasida
- Order: Achromatorida
- Family: Haemohormidiidae
- Genus: Dobellia

Species
- Dobellia binucleata Dobellia dimorphonucleata

Genus of single-celled organisms

Dobellia is a genus of parasitic alveolates of the phylum Apicomplexa.

== History ==
The species and genus was described in 1913 by Brumpt.

== Description ==
Dobellia binucleata infects the intestinal cells of the sipunculid worm Golflngia minutum
