= Buparvaquone =

Chemical compound

Clinical data
- ATCvet code: QP51EX03 (WHO)

Identifiers
- IUPAC name: 2-((4-tert-Butylcyclohexyl)methyl)-3-hydroxy-1,4-naphthoquinone
- CAS Number: 88426-33-9
- ChemSpider: 10807457
- UNII: 0354RT7LG4
- ChEMBL: ChEMBL292009
- CompTox Dashboard (EPA): DTXSID4057849
- ECHA InfoCard: 100.115.556

Chemical and physical data
- Formula: C_{21}H_{26}O_{3}
- Molar mass: 326.436 g·mol^{−1}
- 3D model (JSmol): Interactive image
- SMILES: CC(C)(C)C3CCC(C\C2=C(/O)C(=O)c1ccccc1C2=O)CC3
- InChI: InChI=1S/C21H26O3/c1-21(2,3)14-10-8-13(9-11-14)12-17-18(22)15-6-4-5-7-16(15)19(23)20(17)24/h4-7,13-14,24H,8-12H2,1-3H3; Key:KLLIVCPQDTYMLC-UHFFFAOYSA-N

Buparvaquone is a naphthoquinone antiprotozoal drug related to atovaquone. It is a promising compound for the therapy and prophylaxis of all forms of theileriosis. Buparvaquone has been shown to have anti-leishmanial activity in vitro. It can be used to treat bovine East Coast fever protozoa in vitro, along with the only other substance known – Peganum harmala. It is the only really effective commercial therapeutic product against bovine theileriosis, where it has been used since the late 1980s.

== Industrial production ==
It was first produced in Great Britain, then in Germany. Its patent expired in the mid-2000s, and was then produced in different countries such as India and Iran.

== Use in bovine theileriosis ==
Using a single dose of 2.5 mg/kg, the recovery rate of curable cases is 90 to 98%. In tropical theileriosis, a dosage of 2.0 mg/kg has the same efficacy. Body temperature returns to normal in two to five days. Parasitemia lowers from 12% on day 0 to 5% the next day, then to 1% by day 5 and none at day 7.

== Viruses ==
Buparvaquone has been shown to inhibit completely vaccinia virus in cell based assay in human cell line.

== Molecular target ==
Buparvaquone resistance appears to be associated with parasite mutations in the Q_{o} quinone-binding site of mitochondrial cytochrome b. Its mode of action is thus likely to be similar to that of the antimalarial drug atovaquone, a similar 2-hydroxy-1,4-naphthoquinone that binds to the Q_{o} site of cytochrome b thus inhibiting Coenzyme Q – cytochrome c reductase.
