= Globidiellum =

Scientific classification
- Domain: Eukaryota
- Clade: Sar
- Superphylum: Alveolata
- Phylum: Apicomplexa
- Class: Aconoidasida
- Order: Achromatorida
- Family: Haemohormidiidae
- Genus: Globidiellum; Brumpt, 1913

Species
- Globidiellum multifidum

Genus of single-celled organisms

Globidiellum is a genus of parasitic alveolates of the phylum Apicomplexa.

== Taxonomy ==
This genus was first described in 1909 by Neumann in Arnoglossus grohmanni and the sand goby (Gobius minutus) and was named Globidium. Henry in 1913 also described this genus in the haddock (Melanogrammus aeglefinus). The genus name was amended to Globidiellum by Brumpt in 1913 who noted that the Globidium was already in use.

== Description ==
Other than the original descriptions of this genus very little is known about this genus.
