= Borostomias abyssorum =

Conservation status
- Data Deficient (IUCN 3.1)

Scientific classification
- Domain: Eukaryota
- Kingdom: Animalia
- Phylum: Chordata
- Class: Actinopterygii
- Order: Stomiiformes
- Family: Stomiidae
- Genus: Borostomias
- Species: B. abyssorum

Binomial name
- Borostomias abyssorum (Köhler, 1896)

Species of fish

Borostomias abyssorum is a species of fish in the family Stomiidae. The species has been documented in the Atlantic Ocean near France, and adults can reach a maximum size of ~7.5 centimeters.
