= Echinococcidium =

Scientific classification
- Domain: Eukaryota
- Clade: Sar
- Clade: Alveolata
- Phylum: Apicomplexa
- Class: Aconoidasida
- Order: Achromatorida
- Family: Haemohormidiidae
- Genus: Echinococcidium; Porchet, 1978

Species
- Echinococcidium notomasti

Genus of single-celled organisms

Echinococcidium is a genus of parasitic alveolates in the phylum Apicomplexa.

== History ==
This genus was described by Porchet in 1978 in specimens collected in Boulogne, France.

== Taxonomy ==
At present only a single species in this genus is known - Echinococcidium notomasti.
