= Haematractidium =

Scientific classification
- Domain: Eukaryota
- Clade: Sar
- Superphylum: Alveolata
- Phylum: Apicomplexa
- Class: Aconoidasida
- Order: Achromatorida
- Family: Haemohormidiidae
- Genus: Haematractidium; Henry, 1910

Species
- Haematractidium scombri

Genus of single-celled organisms

Haematractidium is a genus of parasitic alveolates in the phylum Apicomplexa. It infects the Atlantic mackerel (Scomber scombrus).

== History ==
This genus was first described by Henry in 1910. Although it is occasionally re described very little is known about it.

== Taxonomy ==
There is one known species in this genus: Haematractidium scombri.

== Description ==
The parasite is intra erythrocytic, ameboid, oval or pyriform in shape. There are no vacuoles or reticulation in the cytoplasm. The nucleus has two or more chromatin granules. The parasite has a single membrane.
