= Toxocystis =

Scientific classification
- Domain: Eukaryota
- Clade: Sar
- Superphylum: Alveolata
- Phylum: Apicomplexa
- Class: Aconoidasida
- Order: Achromatorida
- Family: Haemohormidiidae
- Genus: Toxocystis; Léger & Duboscq, 1910
- Species: T. homari

Binomial name
- Toxocystis homari Léger & Duboscq, 1910

Genus of single-celled organisms

Toxocystis is a genus of parasites of the phylum Apicomplexa.

Only one species (Toxocystis homari) is known in this genus.

== History ==
This genus was described in 1910 by Léger and Duboscq.

== Description ==
This parasite is found in the caecum of the lobster Homarus gammarus.

== Host records ==
European lobster (Homarus gammarus)
