= Joyeuxella =

Scientific classification
- Domain: Eukaryota
- Clade: Sar
- Superphylum: Alveolata
- Phylum: Apicomplexa
- Class: Aconoidasida
- Order: Achromatorida
- Family: Haemohormidiidae
- Genus: Joyeuxella; Brasil, 1902

Species
- Joyeuxellaa toxoides

Genus of single-celled organisms

Joyeuxella is a genus of parasitic Alveolata of the phylum Apicomplexa.

There is one species in this genus - Joyeuxella toxoides.

== History ==
The species and genus was described in 1902 by Brasil.

== Description ==
This species infects the digestive tract of the trumpet worm Pectinaria koreni.
