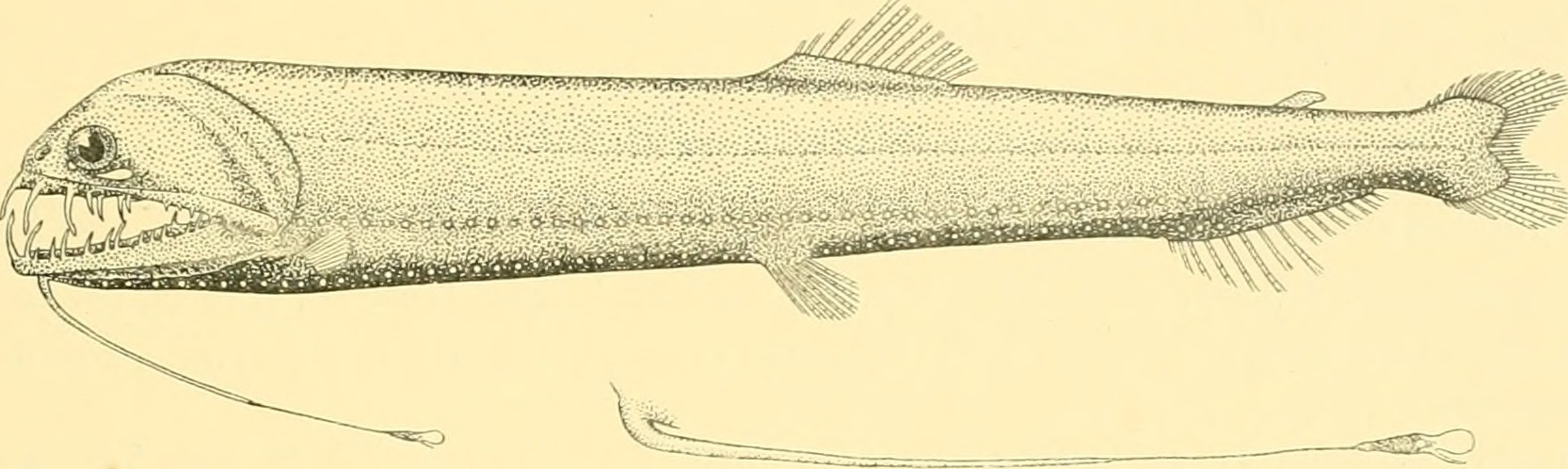
- Borostomias antarcticus

Scientific classification
- Kingdom: Animalia
- Phylum: Chordata
- Class: Actinopterygii
- Order: Stomiiformes
- Family: Stomiidae
- Subfamily: Astronesthinae
- Genus: Borostomias; Regan, 1908

= Borostomias =

Borostomias Temporal range: Middle Miocene to present

Genus of fishes

Borostomias is a genus of barbeled dragonfishes.

The name derives from Greek βόρος (bóros, "glutton") and στομίας (stomías, "hard-mouthed horse").

Indeterminate fossil remains of Borostomias are known from the Middle Miocene (Serravallian) of Italy, making this genus one of the very few barbeled dragonfishes known from fossil remains.

== Species ==
There are currently six recognized species in this genus:

- Borostomias abyssorum (Koehler (fr), 1896)
- Borostomias antarcticus (Lönnberg, 1905) (Snaggletooth)
- Borostomias elucens (A. B. Brauer, 1906)
- Borostomias mononema (Regan & Trewavas, 1929) (Sickle snaggletooth)
- Borostomias pacificus (S. Imai, 1941)
- Borostomias panamensis Regan & Trewavas, 1929 (Panama snaggletooth)
