= Haemohormidium =

Scientific classification
- Domain: Eukaryota
- Clade: Sar
- Superphylum: Alveolata
- Phylum: Apicomplexa
- Class: Aconoidasida
- Order: Achromatorida
- Family: Haemohormidiidae
- Genus: Haemohormidium; Henry, 1910

Species
- Haemohormidium batrachi Haemohormidium beckeri Haemohormidium clariae Haemohormidium cotti Haemohormidium gallinarum Haemohormidium guglielmi Haemohormidium hareni Haemohormidium ptyodactyli Haemohormidium rubrimarensis Haematractidium scombri Haemohormidium scorpius Haemohormidium terraenovae

Genus of single-celled organisms

Haemohormidium is a genus of parasitic alveolates in the phylum Apicomplexa. They have two hosts in their life cycle: the vertebrate hosts are fish and the invertebrate vectors are leeches.

== Taxonomy ==
The genus was created in 1910 by Henry who described the type species, Haemohormidium cotti, in the short spined sea scorpion (Myxocephalus scorpius) and the long spined sea scorpion (Taurulus bubalis). Its nature was unclear until the electron microscopic studies revealed its relationship to the Apicomplexia.

Henry in 1913 abandoned the name but the genus was validated by Wenyon in 1926. The species in the genus Babesiosoma were initially incorporated into this genus in 1969 but have subsequently been demerged.

Some authors consider this genus to be synonymous with Dactylosoma.

Henry also in 1910 described a second genus - Haematractidium: this is now considered synonymous with Haemohormidium.

It seems that the taxonomy of this group may yet undergo further revision.

== Description ==
Species in this genus have

- a single boundary membrane
- may have closely apposed nuclei with nucleoli
- cytoplasmic dense material of variable structure
- the apical complex lacks a conoid

== Host records ==
- H. beckeri — Laval's eelpout (Lycodes lavalaei), Vahl's eelpout (Lycodes vahlii)
- H. cotti — short spined sea scorpion (Myxocephalus scorpius), long spined sea scorpion (Taurulus bubalis)
- H. terranovae — American plaice (Hippoglossoides platessoides)
