= Biliary fever =

Tick-borne disease of dogs, cats and horses

Biliary fever is an illness of the liver affecting horses, dogs and cats.

This is currently the most common infectious disease of dogs in Southern Africa. It is also known as tick bite fever or "Bosluiskoors" in Afrikaans. It is caused by a tiny parasite (Babesia canis) which is introduced into the body by a tick bite. This parasite then enters and destroys red blood cells. Biliary in dogs has a lot in common with malaria in man, except that in the latter, a mosquito is the vector.

== Presentation ==
The peracute (very sudden and severe) form causes death within a few hours and treatment is of little avail. More commonly dogs suffer from the acute or subacute form. This is recognised by the dog being listless or lethargic, losing its appetite and running a temperature. If your dog is off its food, take a rectal temperature reading. If this is 39 °C or higher you should have the dog examined – do not wait until its mucous membranes become pale, white or yellow, which commonly suggests a more advanced stage of the disease. Fever is present only while the patient is actively fighting the parasite; the disease may be present with a normal (38,5 °C) or subnormal temperature. Yellow faeces and brown or red urine also suggests the presence of biliary fever.

== Diagnosis ==
A small drop of blood is collected and a smear made. Once stained, the parasites can be seen in the red blood cells under microscopic evaluation.

== Prevention ==
A vaccine has been launched in South Africa at the end of 2008. Nobivac Piro, has been proven effective when combined with twice yearly booster shots. Rely on reducing the dog's tick population by regular use of approved tick control measures that may be recommended by a veterinarian.

== Treatment ==
Treatment should only be given after a positive diagnosis has been made by means of a blood test. Usually treatment is effective, depending on several factors, but the majority will respond. In early cases simple injections are usually sufficient, but in others blood transfusions, electrolyte infusions per vein, liver tonics, blood-building, etc., may be required.

=== Diet ===
Avoid fatty foods, and give a good quality balanced dog food. A tonic and/or follow up treatment may be required if the animal does not appear to be responding to the initial treatment.
