= Borostomias elucens =

Conservation status
- Least Concern (IUCN 3.1)

Scientific classification
- Domain: Eukaryota
- Kingdom: Animalia
- Phylum: Chordata
- Class: Actinopterygii
- Order: Stomiiformes
- Family: Stomiidae
- Genus: Borostomias
- Species: B. elucens

Binomial name
- Borostomias elucens (Brauer, 1906)

Species of fish

Borostomias elucens is a species of fish in the family Stomiidae. The species can be found in the Atlantic Ocean at depths ranging from 500 meters to 2,500 meters, and adults can reach a maximum length of ~35 centimeters.
