= Cristalloidophora =

Scientific classification
- Domain: Eukaryota
- Clade: Sar
- Superphylum: Alveolata
- Phylum: Apicomplexa
- Class: Aconoidasida
- Order: Achromatorida
- Family: Haemohormidiidae
- Genus: Cristalloidophora; Dehorne, 1934

Species
- Cristalloidophora dodecaceriae

Genus of single-celled organisms

Cristalloidophora is a genus of parasitic alveolates of the phylum Apicomplexa.

There is one species in this genus - Cristalloidophora dodecaceriae.

== History ==
The species and genus was described in 1934 by Dehorne.

== Description ==
This species infects the digestive tract of the polychaete shell worm Dodecaceria.
