= Rangelia =

Scientific classification
- Domain: Eukaryota
- Clade: Diaphoretickes
- Clade: SAR
- Clade: Alveolata
- Phylum: Apicomplexa
- Class: Aconoidasida
- Order: Piroplasmida
- Family: Theileriidae
- Genus: Rangelia

Species
- Rangelia vitalii

Genus of single-celled organisms

Rangelia is a genus of parasitic alveolates of the phylum Apicomplexa.

== History ==
This organism was first described in Brazil in 1910. This discovery was not confirmed until 2011 when experimental transmission of the organism showed its pathological capabilities.

== Description ==
This parasite's normal life cycle involves wild canids and ticks. Domestic dogs are accidental hosts. It has been reported from Argentina, Brazil and Uruguay.

This parasite is transmitted by ticks.

After injection into the vertebrate host the parasite migrates to endothelial cells of the capillaries. The parasites lie within parasitophorous vacuoles that have a trilaminar membrane with villar protrusions. An apical complex is present which includes a polar ring and rhoptries but lacks a conoid.

The parasites may also invade erythrocytes and leukocytes.

== Clinical features ==
The disease caused by infection with this parasite is known as rangeliosis. In Brazil it is also known as nambi-uvú (bleeding ears), peste de sangue (bleeding plague) and febre amarela dos cães (yellow fever of dogs).

=== Presentation ===
The clinical manifestations of this disease are anaemia, jaundice, fever, hepatomegaly, splenomegaly, lymphadenopathy, haematochezia and persistent bleeding from the nose, oral cavity and the tips, margins and outer surface of the pinnae. Other features include lethargy, loss of appetite, weakness, weight loss, dyspnoea, petechiae and haematemesis.

=== Laboratory findings ===
These include regenerative anaemia, spherocytosis, icteric plasma, leukopenia due to neutropenia, thrombocytopenia, eosinopenia and bilirubinuria. The alanine aminotransferase, aspartate aminotransferase and creatine kinase levels may be raised. The gamma-glutamyltransferase, urea and creatinine levels remain normal.

=== Histology ===
Langhans type multinucleate giant cells may be present in the lymph nodes and the choroid plexus.

Erythroid hyperplasia may be present in the bone marrow.

=== Diagnosis ===
Diagnosis may be made by demonstrating the organism in the bone marrow or by serology.

=== Differential diagnosis ===
This includes babesiosis, ehrlichiosis, leishmaniasis and leptospirosis.

=== Notes ===
This disease may be transmitted by blood transfusion.

== Treatment ==
Treatment with diminazene aceturate has been shown to be effective.

== Vectors ==
Amblyomma aureolatum

== Hosts ==
- Crab-eating fox (Cerdocyon thous)
- Pampas fox (Lycalopex gymnocercus)
