= Anthemosoma =

Scientific classification
- Domain: Eukaryota
- Clade: Diaphoretickes
- Clade: SAR
- Clade: Alveolata
- Phylum: Apicomplexa
- Class: Aconoidasida
- Order: Piroplasmida
- Family: incertae sedis
- Genus: Anthemosoma; Landau, Boulard and Housin, 1969
- Species: A. garnhami

Binomial name
- Anthemosoma garnhami Landau, Boulard and Housin, 1969

Genus of parasitic protists in the apicomplex phylum

Anthemosoma is a genus of parasites of the phylum Apicomplexa. There is only one species recognised in this genus - a parasite of mammals.

== History ==
The genus was described in 1969 by Landau, Boulard and Housin.

== Description ==
Although polar rings and rhoptries are present other typical Apicomplexian features including conoid, flagella, oocysts, sporocysts and pseudocysts are absent.

The species parasitises erythrocytes. It is heteroxenous with merogony and gamogony in the vertebrate host. Fertilization and sporogony in the invertebrate host.

Meronts: These occur in erythrocytes. 5-32 merozoites are produced by budding.

Gamonts: These are spheroid or ovoid.
