= Rangeliosis =

Species of carnivore

Rangeliosis is a disease of dogs and other species, caused by the hemoprotozoan parasite Rangelia vitalii.

== Clinical presentation ==
Clinically affected dogs present with splenomegaly, icterus, anemia and thrombocytopenia.

Many dogs may succumb to infection without veterinary intervention.

== Treatment ==
Treatment is usually effective with antiprotozoal drugs.
