= Borostomias pacificus =

Conservation status
- Least Concern (IUCN 3.1)

Scientific classification
- Domain: Eukaryota
- Kingdom: Animalia
- Phylum: Chordata
- Class: Actinopterygii
- Order: Stomiiformes
- Family: Stomiidae
- Genus: Borostomias
- Species: B. pacificus

Binomial name
- Borostomias pacificus (Imai, 1941)

Species of fish

Borostomias pacificus is a species of rarely-seen fish in the family Stomiidae. The species has only been documented in Suruga Bay, located near Japan.
