= Spermatobium =

Scientific classification
- Domain: Eukaryota
- Clade: Sar
- Superphylum: Alveolata
- Phylum: Apicomplexa
- Class: Aconoidasida
- Order: Achromatorida
- Family: Haemohormidiidae
- Genus: Spermatobium; Eisen, 1895

Species
- Spermatobium eclipidrili Spermatobium freundi

Genus of single-celled organisms

Spermatobium is a genus of parasites of the phylum Apicomplexa. It infects oligochaete worms.

== History ==
This genus was described by Eisen in 1895. This genus has been little studied and not much is known about it.

== Taxonomy ==
Two species in this genus have been described: Spermatobium eclipidrili and Spermatobium freundi. The type species is S. eclipidrili.

== Description ==
This parasite infects the sperm sacs of oligochaete worms. The sporogonia contain numerous sporoblasts or spores and a residuum.
