= Progarnia =

Scientific classification
- Domain: Eukaryota
- Clade: Diaphoretickes
- Clade: SAR
- Clade: Alveolata
- Phylum: Apicomplexa
- Class: Aconoidasida
- Order: Haemospororida
- Family: Garniidae
- Genus: Progarnia; Lainson, 1995

Species
- Progarnia archosauriae

Genus of single-celled organisms

Progarnia is a genus of parasitic alveolates belonging to the phylum Apicomplexa.

== History ==
The genus was described in 1995 by Lainson.

== Description ==
Merogony occurs principally in leucocytes and thrombocytes and to a lesser extent in the erythrocytes. No pigment is produced.

Gametogony, like merogony, occurs principally in leucocytes and thrombocytes and to a lesser extent in the erythrocytes. Again no pigment is produced.

Nothing is currently known about parasitic forms outside the blood.

== Hosts ==
The only known host is the spectacled caiman (Caiman crocodilus crocodilus).

== Geographic distribution ==
This genus has been described in South America.
