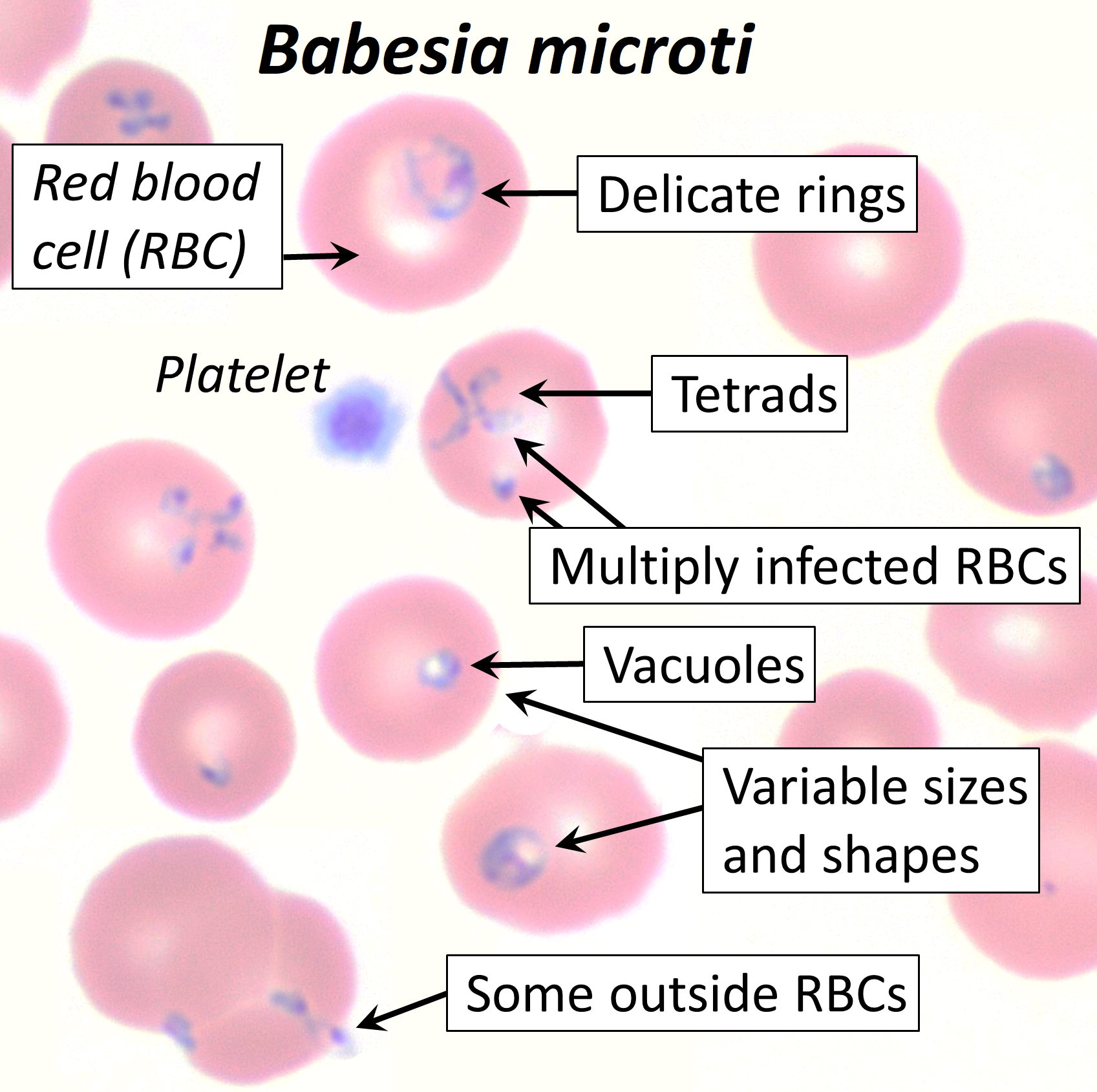
- Blood smear of Babesia microti

Scientific classification
- Domain: Eukaryota
- Supergroup: Alveolata
- Phylum: Apicomplexa
- Class: Aconoidasida
- Order: Piroplasmida
- Family: Babesiidae
- Genus: Babesia; Starcovici, 1893

Species
- Babesia annae; Babesia ardeae; Babesia behnkei; Babesia bennetti; Babesia bicornis; Babesia bigemina; Babesia bovis; Babesia caballi; Babesia canis; Babesia canis canis; Babesia canis rossi; Babesia canis vogeli; Babesia capreoli; Babesia crassa; Babesia divergens; Babesia gibsoni; Babesia hongkongensis; Babesia kiwiensis; Babesia lohae; Babesia mackerrasorum; Babesia major; Babesia motasi; Babesia muratovi; Babesia occultans; Babesia odocoilei; Babesia orientalis; Babesia ovata; Babesia ovis; Babesia pecorum; Babesia peircei; Babesia poelea; Babesia ugwidiensis; Babesia uriae; Babesia venatorum; Babesia vesperuginis; Babesia vitalii; B. microti ("Archaeopiroplasmida") group: Babesia felis; Babesia leo; Babesia microti; Babesia rodhaini; Babesia vulpes; Western US ("Prototheilerids") group: Babesia conradae; Babesia duncani; Babesia lengau; Babesia sp. 'North Carolina dog'

= Babesia =

Genus of protozoan parasites

Babesia, also called Nuttallia, is a genus of apicomplexan parasites that infect red blood cells and are transmitted by ticks. Originally discovered by Romanian bacteriologist Victor Babeș in 1888, over 100 species of Babesia have since been identified.

Babesia comprises more than 100 species of tick-borne parasites that infect erythrocytes (red blood cells) in many vertebrate hosts.

Babesia species infect livestock worldwide, wild and domestic vertebrate animals, and occasionally humans, where they cause the disease babesiosis. In the United States, B. microti is the most common strain of the few that have been documented to cause disease in humans.

== Classification ==
Piroplasmida phylogeny (mtDNA)

- Piroplasmida
  - - - - Babesia s.s.
        - Theileriidae
          - Theileria s.s.
          - Cytauxzoon
      - Theileria equi
    - Babesia conradae
  - Babesia microti

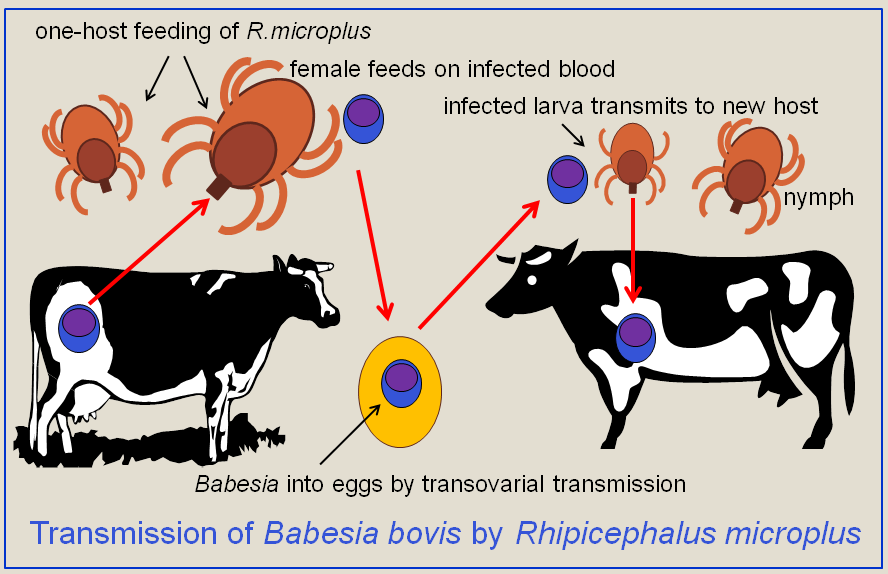
B. bovis transmission

Babesia is a protozoan parasite genus found to infect vertebrate animals, mostly livestock mammals and birds, but also occasionally humans. Common names of the disease that B. microti causes are Texas cattle fever, redwater fever, tick fever, and Nantucket fever. The disease it causes in humans, babesiosis, is also called piroplasmosis.

Babesia microti, however, is not part of the genus Babesia. Due to historical misclassifications, the protozoan has been labeled with many names, including Nuttallia, and was renamed from Babesia microti to Theileria microti based on evidence from 2006. Its genetic sequence, published in 2012, shows that the species belongs to neither Babesia nor Theileria, but instead to a separate genus. Another "western" group is also separate from core Babesia.

The avian Babesia species are characterized as having ring and amoeboid forms, and fan-shaped or cruciform (cross-shaped) tetrad schizonts. Developing parasites have only been reported in red blood cells.

== History ==
For centuries, the animal disease was known to be a serious illness for wild and domesticated animals, especially cattle. In 1888, Victor Babeș first identified the causative agent in Romania and believed it to be due to the bacterium he named Haematococcus bovis. He documented the disease by describing signs of a severe hemolytic illness seen uniquely in cattle and sheep.

In 1893, Americans Theobald Smith and Fred Kilborne identified the parasite as the cause of Texas cattle fever, the same disease described by Babeș. They also identified the tick as the transmitting agent, a discovery which first introduced the concept of arthropods functioning as disease vectors.

It was believed to be a disease that only affected nonhuman mammals, but in 1957, the first case of babesiosis was seen in a human. The person had been splenectomized, as were all people diagnosed with babesiosis until 1969, when the first case of babesiosis was diagnosed in a person still having a spleen. This proved the parasite was a potential pathogen in anyone.

== Genetics ==
Babesia species show host specificity, allowing many different subspecies of Babesia to emerge, each infecting a different kind of vertebrate organism. While B. bovis and Babesia bigemina prefer to infect cattle in tropical environments, they can infect other animals, such as the white-tailed deer. Therefore, while the organism has the capacity to display host specificity, and thus increase transmission effectiveness, it can still infect a variety of hosts. It achieves this through mutations and natural selection. In different environments, individual protozoa may develop mutations, which when they increase the protozoa's fitness, allow the population to increase in number. This specificity explains why Babesia species have such great genetic diversity.

Babesia selfishly persists long-term in the host's system: The host gains no benefit from the parasite invasion and only suffers. This allows the parasite to exploit all resources offered by the host, to increase in number and increase the rate of transmission. Too lethal of an infection results in the host's death and the parasite is unable to spread, which is a loss from an evolutionary standpoint. Different species of Babesia are able to withstand the stress of the host's immune system. Infection typically stimulates the innate immune system, but not the humoral immune system. This results in control of the infection, but also persistence and not clearance of the parasite.

=== Genomics ===
The genome of B. microti has been sequenced and shows that the species does not belong to either Babesia or Theileria, but instead to a separate genus. As of 2013, the mitochondrial genome is known to be linear like other sequenced Apicomplexa mitochondrial genomes, although initially it was reported to be circular.

Partial RNA sequencing of canine piroplasms has identified a number of additional species.

== Lifecycle ==
The lifecycle of B. microti, which is typical of parasites in the genus, requires a biological stage in a rodent or deer host. It is transmitted by ticks of the family Ixodidae between these hosts. To begin, the tick as the definitive host becomes infected itself, as it takes up gametocytes when attached for a blood meal. It also introduces the Babesia into the intermediate host (e.g. cattle) when taking a blood meal. As Babesia cells enter the animal's red blood cells (erythrocytes), they are called sporozoites. Within the red blood cell, the protozoa become cyclical and develop into a trophozoite ring. The trophozoites moult into merozoites, which have a tetrad structure coined a Maltese-cross form. Trophozoite and merozoite growth ruptures the host erythrocyte, leading to the release of vermicules, the infectious parasitic bodies, which rapidly spread the protozoa throughout the blood. Rather than producing more and more trophozoites, some of the merozoites produce gametocytes. The gametes are fertilized in the tick gut and develop into sporozoites in the salivary glands. These are the sporozoites the infected tick introduces when it bites an intermediate host. Even as an incidental host, the phase changes that occur in the parasite are the same within humans as in the normal hosts. Babesia can be diagnosed at the trophozoite stage, and can also be transmitted from human to human through the tick vector, through blood transfusions, or through congenital transmission (an infected mother to her baby).

Lifecycle of Babesia

== Seasonality ==
=== Temperature ===
Cold weather completely interrupts transmission. The emergence of tick-borne diseases has been found to coincide with climate change. The correlation between climate change and the incidence of tick-borne diseases is not known to be strong enough to count as a major factor.

=== Humidity ===
High humidity and rainfall accommodate ticks carrying Babesia. This may explain why B. bigemina infection in cattle in the hilly region of Meghalaya has increased. The lifespan and number of generations of B. microplus correlate with increasing the longevity of larvae and the number of annual generations. Warm, dry weather interferes with the Babesia lifecycle within the tick. Warm, wet weather increases the intensity of infestation—the population is able to thrive due to the relatively fluid environment, making water and nutrients more accessible.

== Transmission ==
Babesia species are spread through the saliva of a tick when it bites. Already at its nymphal stage, a tick bites into the skin for a blood meal. The tick, if not removed, stays attached for three to four days, with longer periods of feeding associated with a higher probability of acquiring the parasite. The parasite can survive in the tick as it molts through its various developmental stages, resulting in all tick stages being potentially infectious. Some species of Babesia can be transmitted from a female tick to its offspring before migrating to salivary glands for feeding. B. microti, the most common species in humans, has not been shown to transmit transovarially.

Ticks of domestic animals that transmit Babesia and cause much disease include the very widespread cattle ticks, Rhipicephalus (Boophilus) microplus, and R.(B.) decoloratus. These ticks have a strict one-host feeding cycle on cattle, so the Babesia can only be transmitted by the transovarial route.

In the Americas, Ixodes scapularis is the most common vector. This hard tick, commonly known as a deer tick, is also the vector for other tick-associated illnesses, such as Lyme disease. Many species of Babesia only infect nonhuman mammalian hosts, most commonly cattle, horses, and sheep. B. microti and B. divergens are the two main pathogenic species in humans. Their reservoirs are theorized to be the white-footed mouse (Peromyscus leucopus), voles from the Microtus genus, and the white-tailed deer (Odocoileus virginianus). These woodland species are hypothesized reservoirs because although they are known to harbor the disease, complete reservoir competence has not yet been shown.

Most cases of transmission between humans are attributed to a tick vector. As of 2003, the Centers for Disease Control and Prevention (CDC) acknowledged more than 40 cases of babesiosis contracted from transfusions of packed red blood cells (PRBC), as well as two infections documented from organ transplantation. PRBC transfusions that cause infections were identified through testing the blood donor for B. microti antibodies. The occurrence of Babesia transmission through PRBC blood transfusions puts pressure on governmental organizations (such as the CDC) to heighten standard measures for screening blood donations.

Transmission is also possible through congenital transmission (from an infected mother to her baby). As symptoms may not appear, many women may not be aware they are infected during pregnancy, so a measurement of congenital transmission rate is not known at this time.

Currently, no vectors for avian Babesia have been identified, but they are assumed to be ticks. Babesia species require competent vertebrate and invertebrate hosts to maintain transmission cycles.

== Epidemiology ==
Of the species to infect humans, B. microti is most common in the Americas, whereas B. divergens is the predominant strain found in Europe. Endemic areas are regions of tick habitat, including the forest regions of the Northeastern United States and temperate regions of Europe. Ixodidae, the tick vectors of B. microti, also transmit the better-known Borrelia burgdorferi, the causative agent of Lyme disease. For reasons that remain unclear, in areas endemic to both Lyme disease and babesiosis, Lyme disease transmission prevails and is more predominant in the region. Prevalence of babesiosis in malaria-endemic regions remains unknown due to the likelihood of misdiagnosis as malaria. As the disease results in a high number of asymptomatic individuals, many populations can possess high seroprevalence without much documentation of illness. For example, in Rhode Island and Nantucket, seroprevalence has been measured to be 20–25%. Prevalence of babesiosis is mostly documented from May to September, when tick activity in endemic regions is high.

The avian Babesia include 15 species, and four Babesia species have been reported from sea hosts. B. poelea was described from brown boobies (Sula leucogaster) on Sand Island, Johnston Atoll, Central Pacific. B. poelea was reported from a masked booby (Sula dactylatra melanops) from Desnoeufs Island, Amirantes, Seychelles. B. peircei has been observed in two species of penguins, the jackass penguin (Sphenicus demersus) from South Africa and the little penguin (Eduyptula minor) from southern Australia. B. bennetti was associated from the yellow-legged gull (Larus cachinnans) from Benidorm Island off the coast of Spain. B. uriae was found in common murres in California.

About 40 cases of human babesiosis, caused by intraerythrocytic protozoans (protozoa inside red blood cells) of the genus Babesia, were reported in Europe.

== Disease ==
Bovine babesiosis caused by B. bovis is an important constraint for cattle industries worldwide.

=== In humans ===
Signs of infection with B. microti usually arise one to eight weeks after a bite from an infectious tick. Infections from B. divergens have a shorter latent period, usually ranging from one to three weeks. The severity of B. microti infections varies. For 25% of cases in adults and 50% of cases in children, the disease is asymptomatic or mild with flu-like symptoms. In other cases, symptoms are characterized by irregular fevers, chills, headaches, general lethargy, pain, and malaise. In severe cases, effects of parasitic multiplication, symptoms such as hemolytic anemia, jaundice, shortness of breath, and hemoglobinuria have been documented. Individuals with normal immune function and healthy spleens often recover without treatment.

Splenectomized patients are more susceptible to contracting the disease and can die within five to eight days of symptom onset. They have severe hemolytic anemia, and occasional hepatomegaly has been documented. Parasitemia levels can reach up to 85% in patients without spleens, compared to 1–10% in individuals with spleens and effective immune systems.

Complications include acute respiratory failure, congestive heart failure, and kidney failure. Infections can be fatal in 5–10% of hospitalized patients, with increased risk of death in the immunosuppressed, the elderly, and those also infected with Lyme disease. B. divergens infections have a much higher fatality rate (42%) and present with more severe symptoms. Infected individuals experience hemoglobinuria followed by jaundice, a persistently high fever, chills, and sweats. If left untreated, B. divergens infections can develop into shock-like symptoms with pulmonary edema and kidney failure.

In birds

The pathogenicity of B. uriae for murres is currently unknown. Birds were found with lesions, anemia and respiratory difficulty, and tissues of avian hosts were affected. B. peircei infections can cause mild anemia, leukocytosis, and impairment of hepatic function in African penguins.

=== Diagnostic tests ===
As a protozoan parasite, Babesia infection can be identified through blood culture, direct examination in blood smear and PCR.

== Morphology ==
Babesia species enter red blood cells (erythrocytes) at the sporozoite stage. Within the red blood cell, the protozoa become cyclical and develop into a trophozoite ring. The trophozoites moult into merozoites, which have a tetrad structure coined a Maltese-cross form. This tetrad morphology seen with Giemsa staining of a thin blood smear is unique to Babesia, and distinguishes it from Plasmodium falciparum, a protozoan of similar morphology that causes malaria. Trophozoite and merozoite growth ruptures the host erythrocyte, leading to the release of vermicules, the infectious parasitic bodies, which rapidly spread the protozoa throughout the blood. It is important to pay attention to particular morphologies of Babesia in blood smears, because of its great similarity to the malarial parasite Plasmodium falciparum. This has resulted in many patients with babesiosis being misdiagnosed. The few distinguishing factors for Babesia include protozoa with varying shapes and sizes, the potential to contain vacuoles, and the lack of pigment production. Trophozoites appearing in a tetrad formation within an erythrocyte are also indicative of Babesia.

Despite much study of babesiosis and malaria, misdiagnosis with blood smear can be frequent and problematic. To supplement a blood smear, diagnoses should be made with an indirect fluorescent antibody (IFA) test, which has a much higher specificity than stained blood smears, with antibody detection in 88-96% of infected patients. Diagnostic measures through antibody testing are also particularly useful for identifying serum prevalence in asymptomatic individuals. Due to the transmissibility of Babesia through blood transfusions, IFA testing would be an effective means of screening for the disease in blood donations.

Historically, babesiosis diagnosis was carried out with xenodiagnosis in hamsters for B. microti and in gerbils for B. divergens. This diagnostic technique has been abandoned in favor of faster diagnostic measures.

=== Treatment ===
Several methods are available to manage and treat babesiosis in animals.

In humans, many spontaneously recover, having only experienced mild symptoms not diagnosed as the disease. This is almost always seen in B. microti infections, which are generally more common in the United States. For B. divergens and more severe B. microti infections, the standard treatment historically for symptomatic individuals was oral or intravenous clindamycin with oral quinine. With the results of research completed in 2000, however, treatment regimens have been increasingly leaning towards oral atovaquone with oral azithromycin. The latter are preferred, as they are equally effective in all but the most severe cases and exhibit fewer associated adverse reactions. In severe cases, blood exchange transfusions have been performed to lower the parasitic load in an individual. Other measures include addressing and correcting abnormal clinical signs.

In seabirds, primaquine has been used in a study to show effective treatment on infected hosts. Treatment for babesiosis consisted of primaquine (1 mg/kg PO q24h for 10 days; primaquine phosphate 1.76%m/v in stabilized solution, Primaquin Solution, MedPet Ltd, Benrose, South Africa). After, treatment was followed by a phospholipid supplement (1 capsule/bird PO q24h for 12 days; deoiled, enriched phospholipids from soybeans, 300 mg/capsule, Essentiale Extreme, Sanofi Aventis Ltd, Midrand, South Africa); as an attempt to mitigate potential hepatotoxic effects of primaquine. To prevent transmission of Babesia and other tickborne pathogens, all birds with visible ectoparasites are treated with pesticide powder (carbaryl 50 g/kg) upon admission, and the facilities are thoroughly cleaned on a daily basis.

=== Prevention in animals ===
In 1906, efforts were made to eradicate the tick vector of bovine babesiosis in the United States. This eradication was recorded as being successfully completed. The disease was eradicated from the United States by 1943, except for a permanent quarantine area along the Texas/Mexico border, where cattle fever ticks are still found.

Effective control can be achieved by vaccination with live attenuated phenotypes of the parasite. The vaccines have a number of drawbacks, so better, safer vaccines are still being researched. In recent years, a number of parasite proteins with immunogenic potential have been discovered. Through polymerase chain reaction, genetic sequencing, and bioinformatics analysis of the genes, a high degree of conservation (98–100%) was found among Brazilian isolates of B. bovis and the T2Bo isolate. Thus, these genes are considered for inclusion in a recombinant cocktail vaccine for cattle babesiosis caused by B. bovis.

=== Prevention in humans ===
The most effective public health measure for Babesia is to avoid tick exposure. This can be through personal prevention such as avoiding tick-infested areas (especially during high tick season between May and September), remaining covered with light clothing, searching for ticks after being outdoors, and removing discovered ticks from the skin. Other measures include applying DEET, a common repellent that is effective against ticks and insects. (For people who react adversely to DEET, alternative insect repellents should be used.) On a state level, if health departments are particularly motivated, tick elimination is a possibility. In 1906, efforts were made to eradicate the tick vector of the bovine disease form of babesiosis in the United States. This eradication was recorded as being successfully completed four decades later.

Complete eradication through vector control would be a long-term project, which would significantly reduce the prevalence of both babesiosis and Lyme disease, but as public health departments are often short on funding, preventive measures are more recommended.

Due to the relatively low prevalence of the human disease and the presence of several reservoirs, babesiosis has not been a candidate for vaccines. In regions where ticks of domestic animals are routinely controlled with chemical acaricides to reduce incidence of infection with B. bovis and B. bigemina, the risk to humans from these parasites is reduced.
