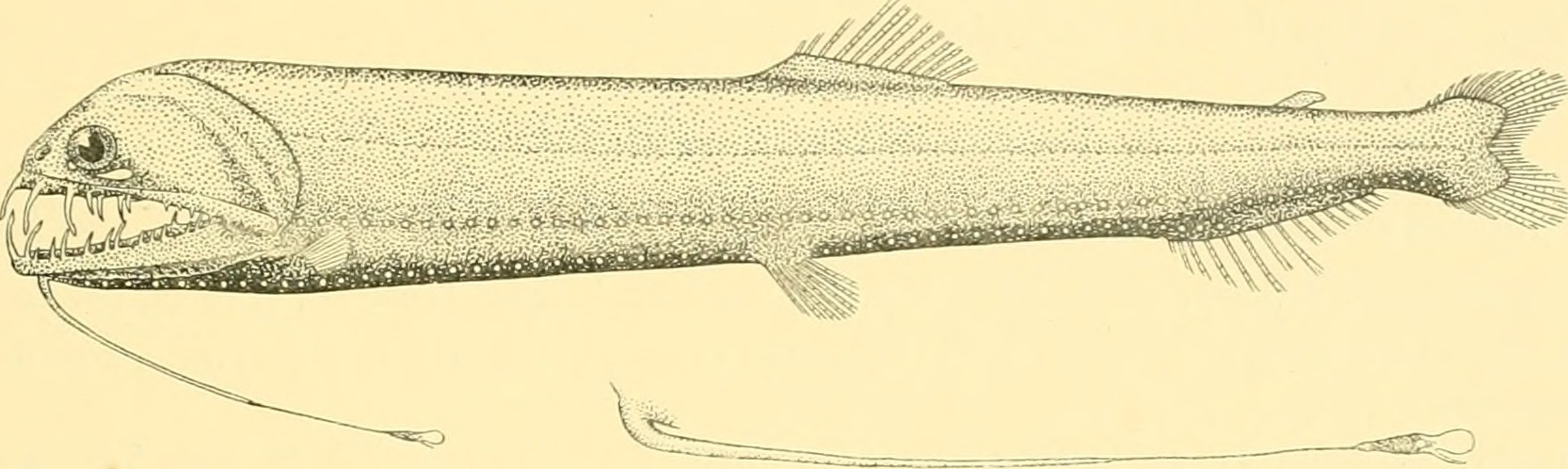

Conservation status
- Least Concern (IUCN 3.1)

Scientific classification
- Kingdom: Animalia
- Phylum: Chordata
- Class: Actinopterygii
- Order: Stomiiformes
- Family: Stomiidae
- Genus: Borostomias
- Species: B. antarcticus

Binomial name
- Borostomias antarcticus (Lönnberg, 1905)

Synonyms
- Astronesthes antarcticus Lönnberg, 1905; Borostomias macrophthalmoides Koefoed, 1956; Borostomias macrophthalmus Regan & Trewavas, 1929; Borostomias roulei Regan & Trewavas, 1929; Diplolychnus bifilis Regan & Trewavas, 1929

= Large-eye snaggletooth =

Species of fish

The large-eye snaggletooth (Borostomias antarcticus), also called the straightline dragonfish or Antarctic snaggletooth, is a species of fish in the family Stomiidae (barbeled dragonfishes).

== Description ==
The large-eye snaggletooth is black in colour, up to 35 cm (14 in) in length. It has 9–13 dorsal soft rays and 12–17 anal soft rays. It is identified by the lack of high arch in the photophores behind the anal base, presence of double postorbital organ and the clear separation of the dagger-like teeth in its upper jaw. It has 40–60 lateral photophores extending along its belly and positioned in two straight lines. The genome of Borostomias antarcticus contains at least fifteen filovirus-like elements (nucleoprotein-like) of which nine have extended open reading frames.

== Habitat ==
The large-eye snaggletooth is bathydemersal and mesopelagic, staying below 500 m (1,600 ft) during the day, sometimes as deep as 2,500 m (8,200 ft). It is found in oceans worldwide.

== Behaviour ==
The large-eye snaggletooth feeds on mysids, bony fish and crustaceans.
