= Fallisia =

Scientific classification
- Domain: Eukaryota
- Clade: Sar
- Clade: Alveolata
- Phylum: Apicomplexa
- Class: Aconoidasida
- Order: Haemospororida
- Family: Garniidae
- Genus: Fallisia

Species
- Subgenus Fallisia: Fallisia audaciosa; Fallisia biporcati; Fallisia copemani; Fallisia effusa; Fallisia modesta; Fallisia siamense; Fallisia simplex; Subgenus Plasmodiodes: Fallisia neotropicalis

Genus of single-celled organisms

Fallisia is a genus of the family Plasmodiidae.

The genus was created by Lainson, Landau and Shaw in 1974. A revision of the genus Plasmodium by Levine in 1985 considered this subgenus to be a synonym of Plasmodium. The description of a new species Plasmodium siamense by Telford in 1986 lead to a resurrection of this as a subgenus. Further revision of its taxonomic status has led to its elevation to genus status.

Species in this genus infect birds and lizards.

== Diagnostic features ==
Species in this genus have the following characteristics:

The schizonts and gametocytes are found in the circulating leukocytes and thrombocytess.

Pigment is absent.

== Subgenera ==
There are two recognised subgena - Fallisia Telford 1998 and Plasmodiodes Gabaldon, Ulloa & Zerpa 1985. Species in Fallisia infect lizards and those in Plasmodiodes infect birds.

Until confirmed by molecular methods this classification should be regarded as tentative.

== Host distribution ==
These species infect lizards of the Iguanidae and Teiidae. They may also infect the Scincidae.

== Distribution ==
These parasites are found in the Neotropical area.
