= Bruno Galli-Valerio =

Italian parasitologist, and microbiologist (1867–1943)

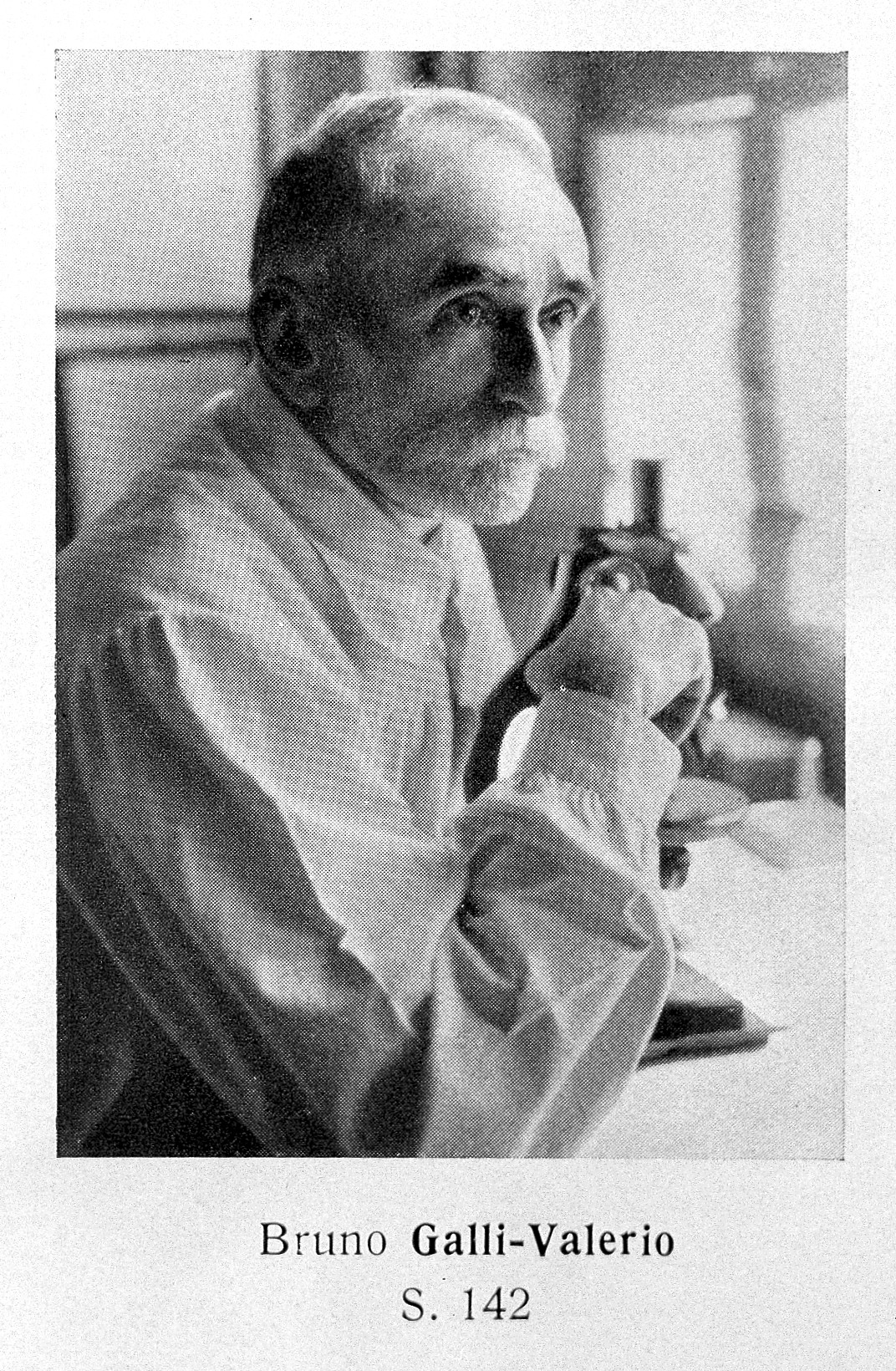

Bruno Galli-Valerio (4 April 1867 – 12 April 1943) was an Italian-Swiss veterinary parasitologist, mountaineer and writer. He served as a professor of hygiene at the University of Lausanne and was a specialist on zoonotic diseases.

== Life and work ==
Galli-Valerio was born in Lecco, son of treasury official Ambrogio and Emilia Valerio. Joining his father on excursions into the mountains, he became interested in the outdoors at an early age. In 1872 the family moved to Bergamo and later to Rome and Napes before moving to Sondrio in 1879. He graduated in veterinary medicine in 1890 from the University of Milan. In 1892 he received a doctorate in medicine from the University of Lausanne under Louis Bourget. He then worked in Milan as a lecturer for five years and then refusing a chair in the University of Parma he took up a position in 1897 in the University of Lausanne as a professor of bacteriology and hygiene. He explored the Valtellina region and assisted professor Angelo de Carlini write Vertebrati della Valtellina in collaboration with Mario Cermenati. Cermenati later founded museums in Lecco. In 1893 he published a mountaineer's medical guide. He was a liberal pacifist and sought peace in 1915 which led him to leave Italy. He published extensively on bacteriology and pathology and was nominated several times for the Nobel Prize in Medicine. He examined the effect of amino acridine in the treatment of Giardiasis.

He died in Lausanne bequeathing his wealth to the Canton of Vaud. A foundation was established in 1944 with his bequest and a veterinary research institute was established in his memory.
