= Echinozoon =

Scientific classification
- Domain: Eukaryota
- Clade: Diaphoretickes
- Clade: SAR
- Clade: Alveolata
- Phylum: Apicomplexa
- Class: Aconoidasida
- Order: Piroplasmida
- Family: Babesiidae
- Genus: Echinozoon; Garnham, 1951
- Species: E. hoogstraali

Binomial name
- Echinozoon hoogstraali Garnham, 1951

Genus of single-celled organisms

Echinozoon is a genus of parasitic alveolates of the phylum Apicomplexa. There is one species in this genus - Echinozoon hoogstraali.

== History ==
The species and genus was described in 1951 by Garnham. The parasite was isolated from a bush rock hyrax (Heterohyrax brucei hoogstraali) in 1950 by Hoogstraal and Lawless in Torit, South Sudan.

== Description ==
Filaments are present on parasitized erythrocytes making their identification easy.

The earliest stages (ring forms) are less than two micrometers in size and are oval or round in shape. No filaments are evident at this stage unlike all later stages. The parasites occur singly in the erythrocytes. A vacuole is present. The nucleus is irregular.

Later stages occur in two forms. The smaller of these may be up to 5 micrometers in size, circular in outline, with pale blue cytoplasm that is free of granules. The nucleus lies to the side of the vacuole.

The larger form may be up to nine micrometers in size. The cytoplasm is reddish purple in colour and may contain granules. It is oval or pear shaped. The host erythrocyte may be enlarged. The nucleus lies to one side.

Trophozoites: these multiply by binary fission in the erythrocytes and form pairs.

== Vectors ==
The tick Haemaphysalis bequaerti may be the vector for this species.
