= Cytauxzoon =

Scientific classification
- Domain: Eukaryota
- Clade: Sar
- Clade: Alveolata
- Phylum: Apicomplexa
- Class: Aconoidasida
- Order: Piroplasmida
- Family: Theileriidae
- Genus: Cytauxzoon

Species
- Cytauxzoon felis; Cytauxzoon manul; Cytauxzoon strepsicerosi; Cytauxzoon sylvicaprae

Genus of single-celled organisms

Cytauxzoon is a genus of parasitic alveolates in the phylum Apicomplexa. The name is derived from the Greek meaning an increase in the number of cells in an animal.

== History ==
This genus was created in 1948 when Neitz and Thomas proposed the name Cytauxzoon to accommodate the Theileria like parasites with preerythrocytic schizogony in histiocytes. This is in contrast to schizogony in lymphocytes with the latter being characteristic for Theileria.

This genus was originally described in African ruminants but is now known to be common in felids including the domestic cat (Felis catus). It was first described in the African grey duiker (Sylvicapra grimmia). C. felis was first described by Kier in 1979.

== Taxonomy ==
This genus is closely related to Theileria but differs from it by replicating in macrophages rather than lymphocytes.

== Description ==
=== Life cycle ===
The parasites are transmitted by tick bite. After a cat or other host is bitten by an infected tick the parasites infect mononuclear phagocytes. Within these they undergo asexual reproduction (schizonts). As these leukocytes become engorged with schizonts, they line the lumens of veins and may causing obstruction of blood flow. The schizonts develop into merozoites which eventually cause host cell rupture and enter the blood. These intravascular merozoites infect variable numbers of erythrocytes.

An infected host is then bitten by a tick. The parasites undergo sexual reproduction in the tick's gut.

=== Microscopic appearances ===
The intra erythrocytic forms range in size between 0.8 and 2.3 μm within a mean of 1.64 μm.

== Host records ==
- C. felis — (Felis catus)
- C. felis — Florida panther (Puma concolor couguar)
- C. felis — bobcat (Lynx rufus)
- C. felis — tiger (Panthera tigris)

=== Unknown parasite species ===
- Ocelot (Leopardus pardalis)
- Jaguar (Panthera onca)

== Clinical ==
In cats infection with this parasite is known as cytauxzoonosis and is commonly fatal.

== Vectors ==
- Lone-star tick (Amblyomma americanum)
- American dog tick (Dermacentor variabilis)
- Rhipicephalus appendiculatus
