= Jacques Euzéby =

French parasitologist

Jacques Achille Marie Euzéby (11 August 1920 – 16 April 2010) was a French parasitologist, born in Bagnols-sur-Cèze.

Euzéby specialized in the study of parasites (including the Apicomplexa and fungi) and parasitic diseases. Euzéby was granted the Emile Brumpt Award and the WAAVP Award. He was the father of Alain Euzéby, an economist, and Jean P. Euzéby, a microbiologist specialising in bacterial taxonomy.
