= Garnia (alveolate) =

Scientific classification
- Domain: Eukaryota
- Supergroup: Alveolata
- Phylum: Apicomplexa
- Class: Aconoidasida
- Order: Haemospororida
- Family: Garniidae
- Genus: Garnia; Lainson et al, 1971

Species
- Garnia gonatodi Garnia karyolytica Garnia morula Garnia multiformis Garnia telfordi Garnia uranoscodoni Garnia utingensis

Genus of single-celled organisms

Garnia is a genus of parasitic alveolates belonging to the phylum Apicomplexa.

== History ==
The genus was created in 1971 by Lainson et al.

== Description ==
The vectors of this genus are not known but it is suspected that phlebotomine sandflies may act in this regard.

The type species is Garnia gonatodi.

== Hosts ==
Species in this genus infect lizards.

== Geographic distribution ==
This genus has been described in South America.
