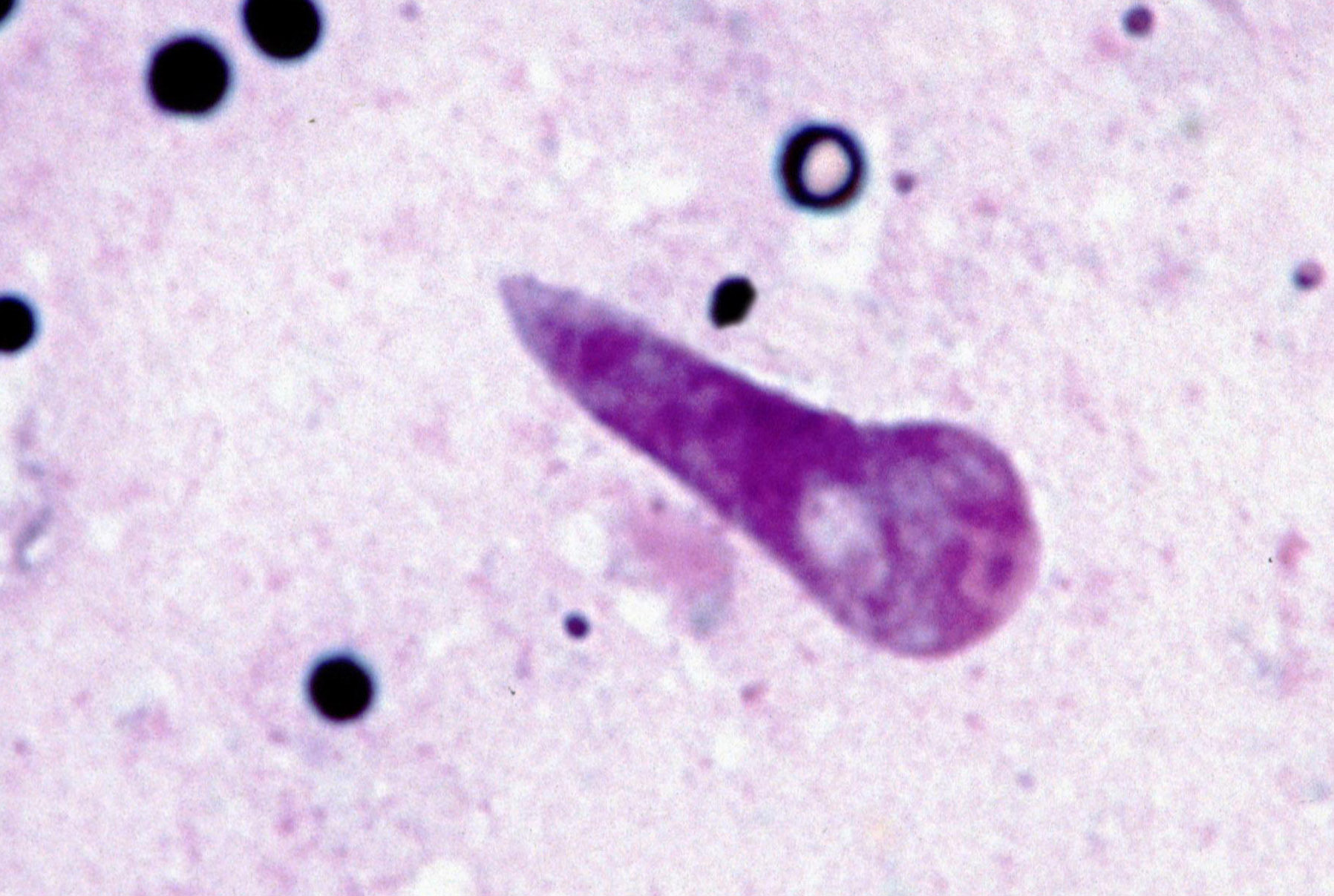
- Kinete stage of Theileria parva in the transmitting tick Rhipicephalus appendiculatus

Scientific classification
- Domain: Eukaryota
- Clade: Sar
- Clade: Alveolata
- Phylum: Apicomplexa
- Class: Aconoidasida
- Order: Piroplasmida
- Family: Theileriidae

Genera and species
- Cytauxzoon; Cytauxzoon felis; Cytauxzoon manul; Rangelia; Rangelia vitalii; Theileria; Theileria annulata; Theileria apogeana; Theileria bicornis; Theileria brachyuri; Theileria buffeli; Theileria capreoli; Theileria cervi; Theileria equi; Theileria fuliginosus; Theileria haneyi; Theileria lestoquardi; Theileria luwenshuni; Theileria mutans; Theileria orientalis; Theileria ornithorhynchi; Theileria ovis; Theileria palmeri; Theileria paparinii; Theileria parva; Theileria parva bovis; Theileria parva lawrencei; Theileria parva parva; Theileria penicillata; Theileria separata; Theileria sergenti; Theileria sinensis; Theileria tachyglossi; Theileria taurotragi; Theileria uilenbergi; Theileria velifera; Theileria worthingtonorum; Theileria youngi

= Theileriidae =

Family of single-celled organisms

Theileriidae is a family of parasites in the order Piroplasmida. It includes the genus Theileria.
