= Garniidae =

Scientific classification
- Domain: Eukaryota
- Clade: Sar
- Clade: Alveolata
- Phylum: Apicomplexa
- Class: Aconoidasida
- Order: Haemospororida
- Family: Garniidae

Genera
- Fallisia; Garnia; Progarnia

Family of single-celled organisms

The Garniidae are a family of parasites in the phylum Apicomplexa. Like many species in the Apicomplexia, all species in this family have two hosts in their lifecycles – one in a vertebrate and one in an invertebrate. The vertebrate hosts are reptiles or birds, but the invertebrate hosts are not known for many of the species.

Species in this family are parasites of erythrocytes and diverse white blood cells. They do not produce pigment, but do have an asexual cycle in the blood.

The type genus is Garnia.

== Taxonomy ==
The genera recognised in this family are:

- Fallisia
- Garnia
- Progarnia
