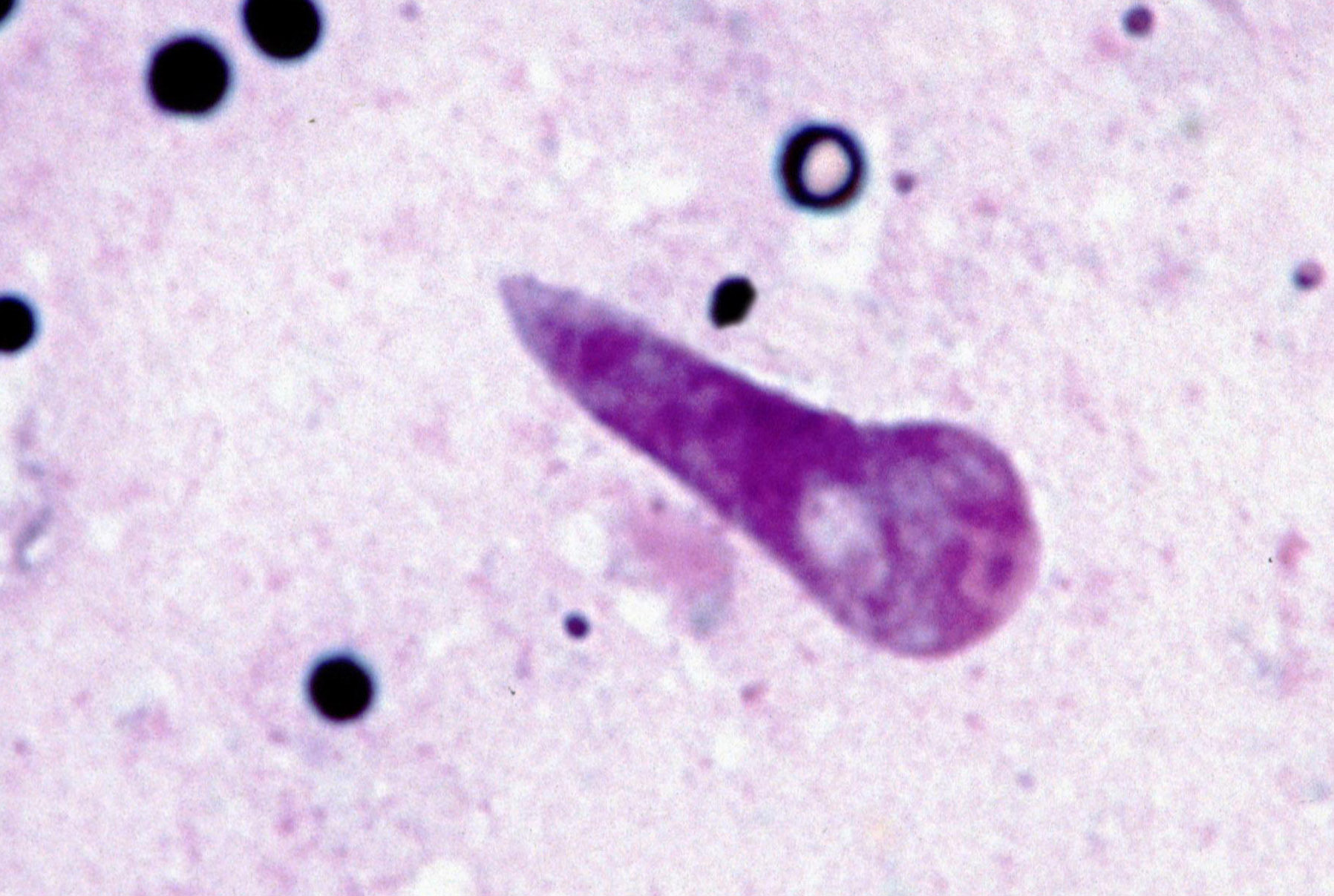
- Kinete stage of Theileria parva in the transmitting tick Rhipicephalus appendiculatus

Scientific classification
- Domain: Eukaryota
- Clade: Sar
- Clade: Alveolata
- Phylum: Apicomplexa
- Class: Aconoidasida
- Order: Piroplasmida
- Family: Theileriidae
- Genus: Theileria; Bettencourt, França & Borges, 1907

Species
- Theileria annulata Theileria electrophori Theileria equi Theileria microti Theileria orientalis Theileria parva

Synonyms
- Haematoxenus Uilenberg, 1964; Cytauxzoon Neitz & Thomas, 1948; Gonderia Toit, 1918

= Theileria =

Genus of single-celled organisms

Theileria is a genus of parasites that belongs to the phylum Apicomplexa and is closely related to Plasmodium. Two Theileria species, T. annulata and T. parva, are important cattle parasites. T. annulata causes tropical theileriosis and T. parva causes East Coast fever. Theileria species are transmitted by ticks. The genomes of T. orientalis Shintoku, Theileria equi WA, Theileria annulata Ankara, and Theileria parva Muguga have been sequenced and published.

Theileria equi infects equid blood cells, causing equine piroplasmosis. The disease presents with a variety of clinical conditions, such as fever, depression, jaundice, cramps, haemolytic anaemia, hemoglobinuria and even death, but asymptomatic infections are frequently observed. The most common vectors are the ticks Dermacentor nitens and Rhipicephalus microplus, but Amblyomma cajennense was also implicated in the disease transmission.

Vaccines against Theileria are in development. In May 2010, a vaccine that was reported to protect cattle against East Coast fever had been approved and registered by the governments of Kenya, Malawi, and Tanzania.

== Description ==
Species in this genus undergo exoerythrocytic merogony in the lymphocytes, histiocytes, erythroblasts, and other cells of the internal organs. This is followed by invasion of the erythrocytes by the merozoites, which may or may not reproduce. When merogony does occur, no more than four daughter cells are produced. The frequent occurrence of elongated bacillary or "bayonet" forms within the erythrocyte is considered as characteristic of this genus.

The organism is transmitted by various tick species, including Rhipicephalus, Dermacentor, and Haemaphysalis. The organism reproduces in the tick as it progresses through its life stages. Both T. annulata and T. parva induce transformation of infected cells of lymphocyte or macrophage/monocyte lineages. T. orientalis does not induce uncontrolled proliferation of infected leukocytes, but instead multiplies predominantly within infected erythrocytes.

Following infection with T. equi, horses may develop detectable antibodies, with seroprevalence varying widely across regions. Serological surveys have revealed a high prevalence of T. equi antibodies in horses and other equids, including 39.8% in Central-Southern Italy and 33.4% in Northern Brazil.

== Genomics ==
The genomes of T. orientalis Shintoku, Theileria equi WA, Theileria annulata Ankara, and Theileria parva Muguga have been sequenced. Genomic data can be accessed though PiroplasmaDB which is part of the Eukaryotic Pathogen Database).

== Evolution ==
The genus is thought to have first appeared in ruminants during the Miocene. It is named for parasitologist Gertrud Theiler, daughter of Arnold Theiler.

== Transmission ==
Theileria species can be transmitted to cattle through tick bites, including the brown ear tick, a Rhipicephalus tick.

== Important species ==
- T. parva is the cause of bovine theileriosis and East Coast fever.
- T. annulata also is a cause of bovine theileriosis.
- T. equi causes equine piroplasmosis. It was originally classified as Babesia equi in 1901 by Charles Louis Alphonse Laveran, but was reclassified as T. equi in 1998 by Heinz Mehlhorn and Eberhard Schein.

== Treatment ==
- Buparvaquone is a promising compound for the therapy and prophylaxis of all forms of theileriosis.
