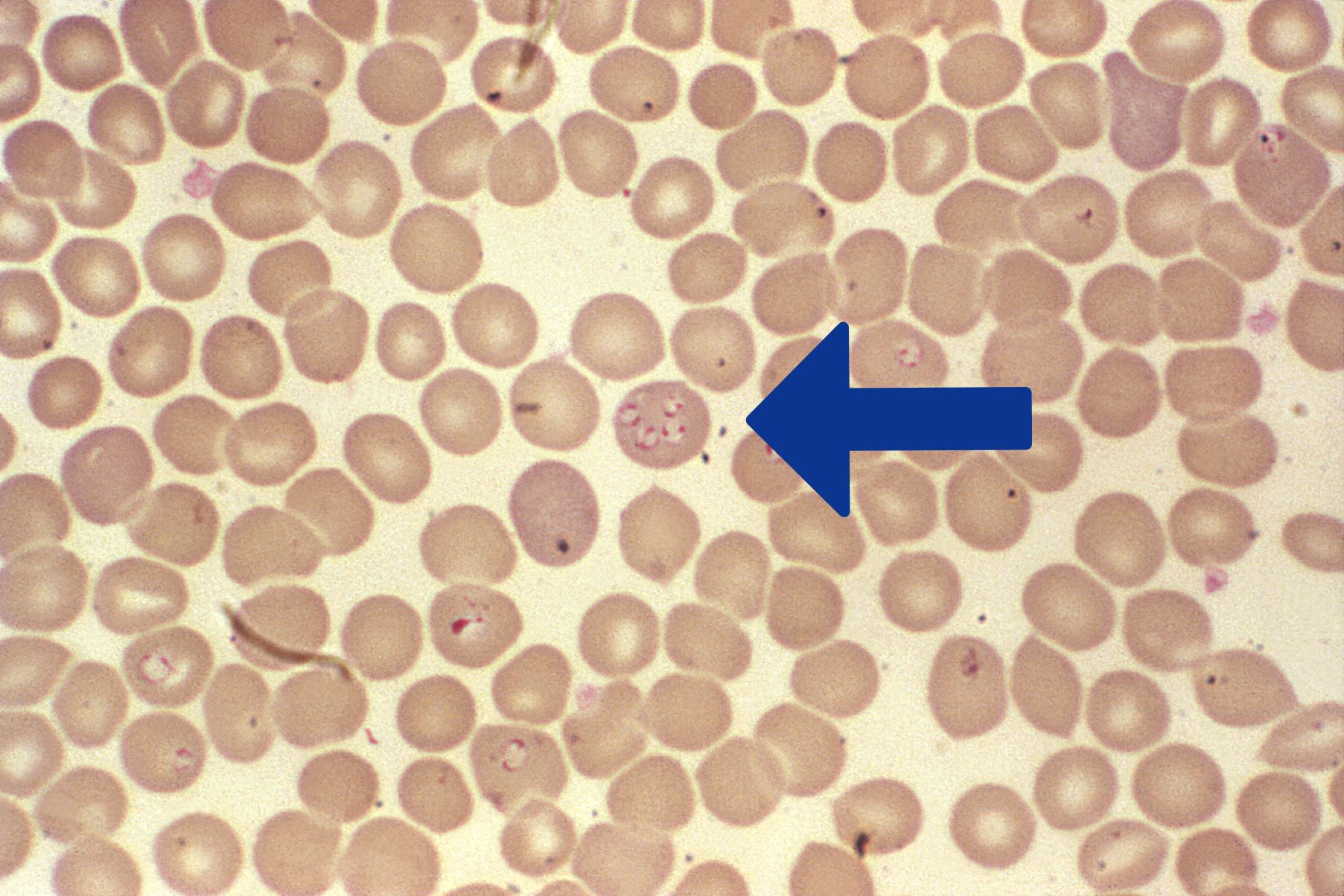
- Babesia sp.

Scientific classification
- Domain: Eukaryota
- Clade: Sar
- Clade: Alveolata
- Phylum: Apicomplexa
- Class: Aconoidasida
- Order: Piroplasmida

Families and genera
- incertae sedis; Anthemosoma; Babesia microti; Babesiidae; Babesia; Echinozoon; Entopolypoides; Dactylosomatidae; Dactylosoma; Haemohormidium; Theileriidae; Haematoxenus; Sauroplasma; Theileria

= Piroplasmida =

Order of parasites in phylum Apicomplexa, vertebrate hosts, tick and leech vectors

Piroplasmida phylogeny (mtDNA)

- Piroplasmida
  - - - - Babesia s.s.
        - Theileriidae
          - Theileria s.s.
          - Cytauxzoon
      - Theileria equi
    - Babesia conradae
  - Babesia microti

Piroplasmida is an order of parasites in the phylum Apicomplexa. They divide by binary fission and as sporozoan parasites they possess sexual and asexual phases (sexual reproduction occurs in the tick gut). They include the tick parasites Babesia and Theileria.

== Description ==
They are minute rounded or pyriform parasites found within erythrocytes, or other circulating or endothelial cells of vertebrates, where they reproduce by merogony. The trophozoite stage is separated from erythrocyte by a single membrane. This distinguishes them from other blood parasites that usually have at least two membranes.

An apical complex with a polar ring and rhopteries occurs, but without a conoid and usually without associated pellicular microtubules. They lack flagella and do not form either oocysts or spores.

The known vectors are ticks or leeches in which they undergo sporogony; sexual reproduction probably occurs in the vector.

== See also ==
- Babesiosis
- Equine piroplasmosis
