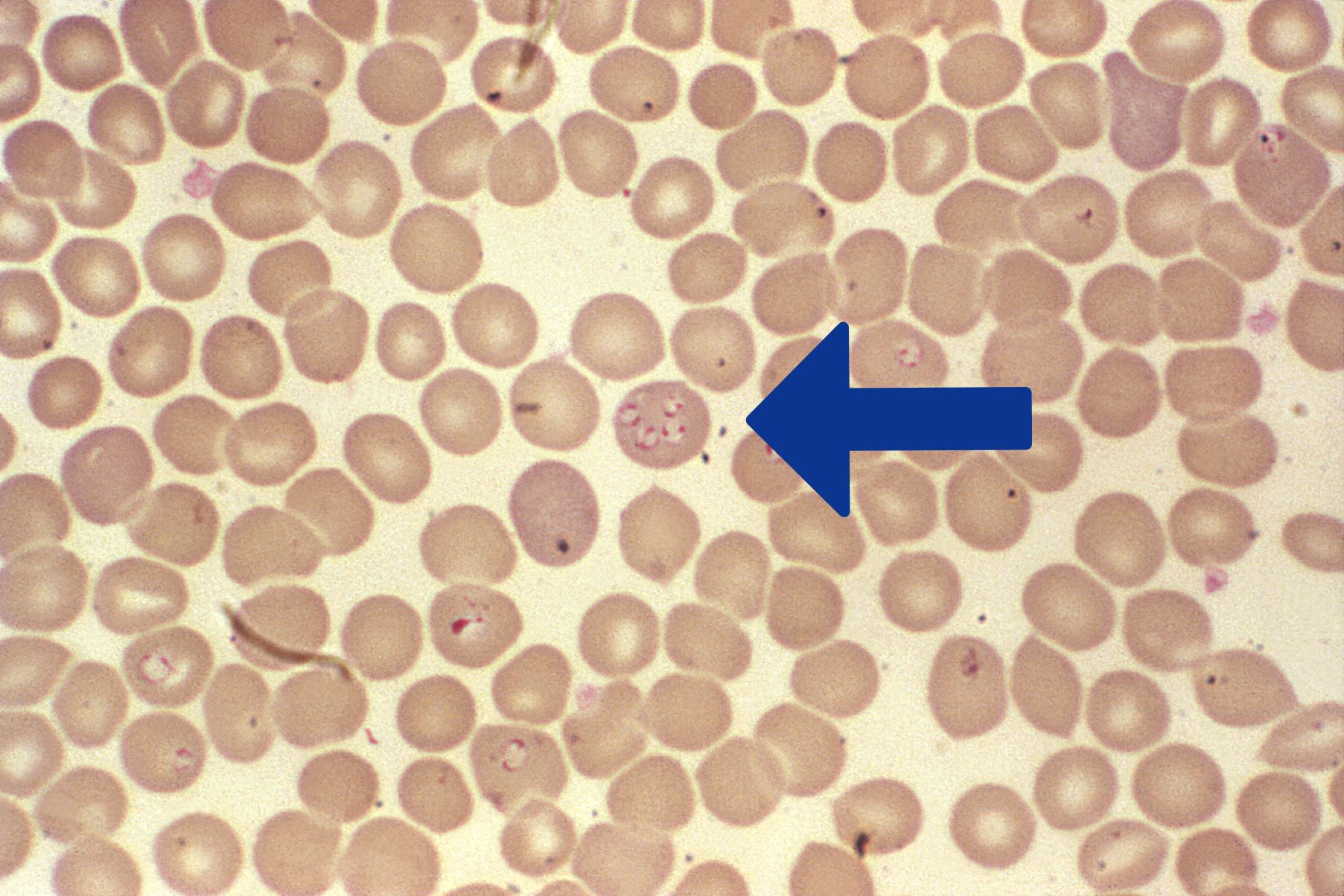
- Babesia sp.

Scientific classification
- Domain: Eukaryota
- Clade: Sar
- Clade: Alveolata
- Phylum: Apicomplexa
- Class: Aconoidasida
- Order: Piroplasmida
- Family: Babesiidae

= Babesiidae =

Family of protists

Babesiidae is a family of protists belonging to the order Piroplasmida.

Genera:

- Babesia Starcovivi, 1893
- Echinozoon Garnham, 1951
