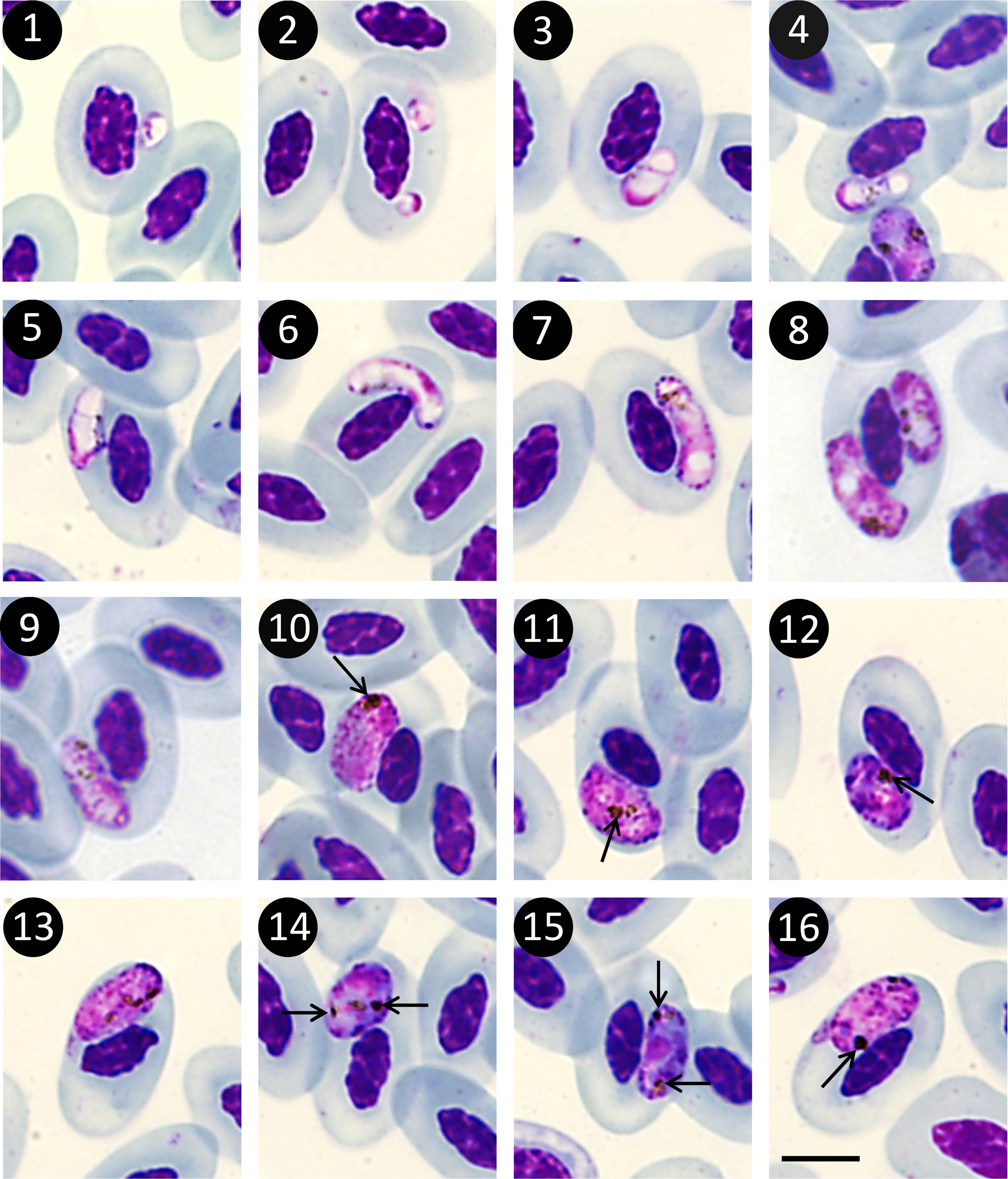
- Haemoproteus ilanpapernai (Haemoproteidae)

Scientific classification
- Domain: Eukaryota
- Clade: Sar
- Clade: Alveolata
- Phylum: Apicomplexa
- Class: Aconoidasida; Mehlhorn et al., 1980

Orders
- Haemospororida; Piroplasmida

Synonyms
- Hematozoa Vivier, 1982

= Aconoidasida =

Class of single-celled organisms

The Aconoidasida are a class of apicomplexan parasites described by Mehlhorn et al in 1980.

== Description ==
Organisms in this class bear a tip at one end of their outer membrane. This apical complex includes vesicles called rhoptries and micronemes, which open at the anterior of the cell. These secrete enzymes that allow the parasite to enter other cells. The tip is surrounded by a band of microtubules, called the polar ring. As the name indicates, Aconoidasida (from Greek: negative prefix a- = "lacking") lack a conoid (they do have one only during the ookinete stage) in contrast to the class Conoidasida which have one throughout their life cycle.

== See also ==
- Haemosporidiasina
