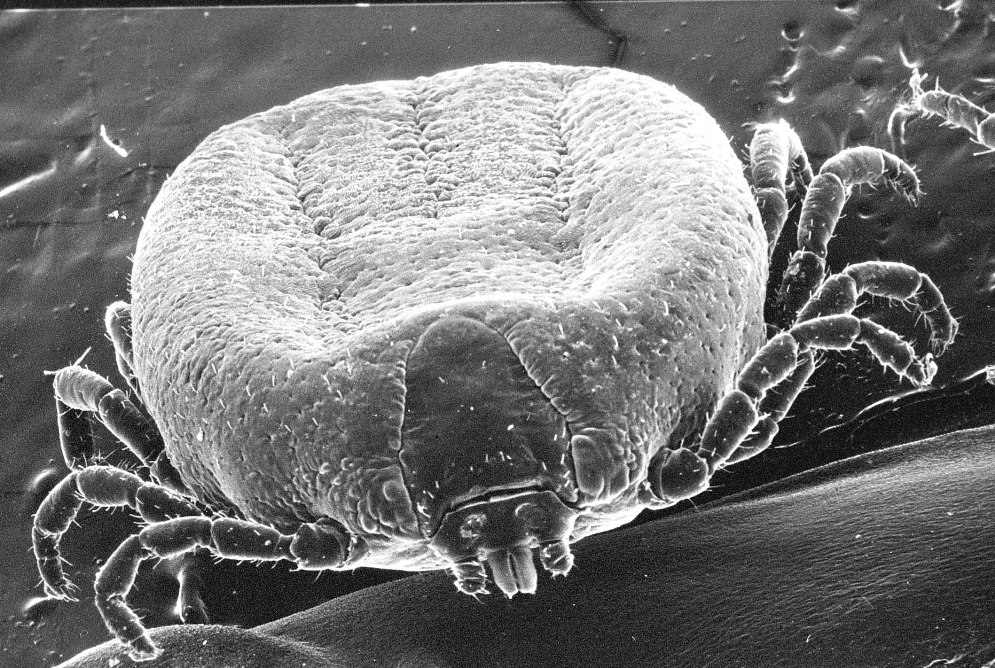
- Scanning electron micrograph of a partially engorged female from Ghana

Scientific classification
- Kingdom: Animalia
- Phylum: Arthropoda
- Subphylum: Chelicerata
- Class: Arachnida
- Order: Ixodida
- Family: Ixodidae
- Genus: Rhipicephalus
- Species: R. annulatus

Binomial name
- Rhipicephalus annulatus (Say, 1821)

Synonyms
- Boophilus annulatus Stiles & Hassall, 1901; Boophilus annulatus affinis Minning, 1934; Boophilus annulatus calcaratus Lahille, 1905; Boophilus balcanicus Minning, 1936; Boophilus bovis Curtice, 1891; Boophilus calcaratus Lahille, 1905; Boophilus calcaratus balcanicus Minning, 1934; Boophilus calcaratus calcaratus Minning, 1934; Boophilus calcaratus hispanicus Minning, 1935; Boophilus calcaratus palestinensis Minning, 1934; Boophilus calcaratus persicus Minning, 1936; Boophilus decoloratus calcaratus Alessandrini, 1917; Boophilus margaropus annulatus Giroud et al., 1963; Boophilus palestinensis Kishida, 1939; Boophilus persicus Kishida, 1939; Boophilus schulzei Minning, 1934; Boophilus (Boophilus) calcaratus balcanicus Minning, 1934; Boophilus (Boophilus) congolensis Minning, 1934; Haemaphysalis rosea Koch, 1844; Ixodes annulatus Say, 1821; Ixodes bovis Riley, 1869; Ixodes calcaratus Birula, 1894; Ixodes dugesi Mégnin, 1880 (misapplied name); Ixodes identatus Gamgee, 1897; Ixodes indentatus Gamgee, 1869; Margaropus annulatus Neumann, 1907; Margaropus annulatus annulatus Neumann, 1911; Margaropus annulatus calcaratus Newstead, Dutton & Todd, 1907; Margaropus annulatus dugesi Castellani & Chalmers, 1919; Margaropus bovis Manson, 1907; Margaropus calcaratus Castellani & Chalmers, 1910; Margaropus dugesi Castellani & Chalmers, 1910; Ornithodoros annulatus Grimaldi, 1934 (misapplied name); Rhipicephalus annulatus Neumann, 1897; Rhipicephalus annulatus calcarata Neumann, 1904; Rhipicephalus annulatus calcaratus Neumann, 1904; Rhipicephalus annulatus dugesi Neumann, 1901; Rhipicephalus bovis Galli-Valerio, 1901; Rhipicephalus calcaratus Birula, 1895; Rhipicephalus decoloratus calcaratus Velu, 1922; Rhipicephalus dugesi Neumann, 1896; Rhipicephalus rosea Salmon & Stiles, 1901; Rhipicephalus (Boophilus) annulatus Neumann, 1904

= Rhipicephalus annulatus =

Species of tick

Rhipicephalus annulatus, the cattle tick, is a hard-bodied tick of the genus Rhipicephalus. It is also known as North American cattle tick, North American Texas fever tick, and Texas fever tick.

== Distribution ==
It shows a cosmopolitan distribution in tropical and subtropical regions of the world. It is found in Eritrea, Albania, Algeria, Benin, Bulgaria, Burkina Faso, Cameroon, Central African Republic, Chad, Colombia, Congo, Cote D'Ivoire, Egypt, Ethiopia, Ghana, Greece, Guam, Guinea, India, Israel, Jordan, Liberia, Libya, Madagascar, Mali, Mexico, Morocco, Nigeria, Portugal, Sierra Leone, South Africa, Spain, Sri Lanka, Sudan, Togo, Tunisia, and Turkey.

== Description ==
The adult has a hexagonally shaped scutum. The male has adanal shields and accessory shields. The anal groove is not distinguishable or absent entirely in the female, and minute in the male.

== Parasitism ==
It is an obligate ectoparasite of domestic mammals such as cattle, horse, sheep, dog. It is a potential vector of many babesiosis pathogens like Babesia bigemina, Babesia bovis, and Anaplasma marginale. Its ability to be a vector of babesiosis pathogens was discovered by Theobald Smith and Frederick L. Kilbourne.

== Lifecycle ==
It shows a one-host lifecycle, where all larva, nymphs and adults live in one host. After eggs hatch, larva crawl up vegetation and may be blown away by wind. After they stick on to a host, larvae are found on softer parts of the host's body. They become nymphs and then adults after successive molts on the body of the host. After attaining sexual maturity and copulating, the female detaches from the host and lays eggs on vegetation. The female dies after ovipositing.

== Control ==
Babesiasis is one of the major cattle devastating diseases throughout the world. It reduce the meat production, and dairy products as well. Quarantine is the major method of controlling ticks. Sanitation and frequent check for ticks also taken place. Preparations of Nigella sativa are a good method to control ticks.

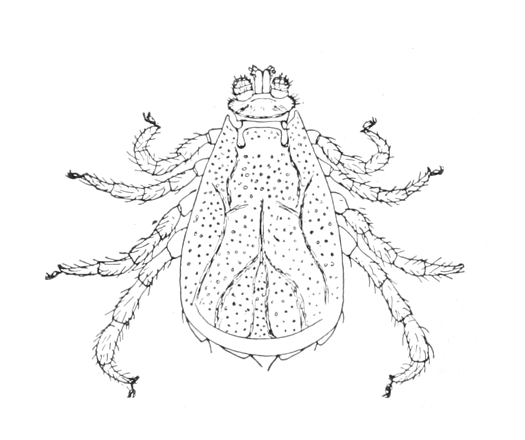
Rhipicephalus annulatus annulatus male
