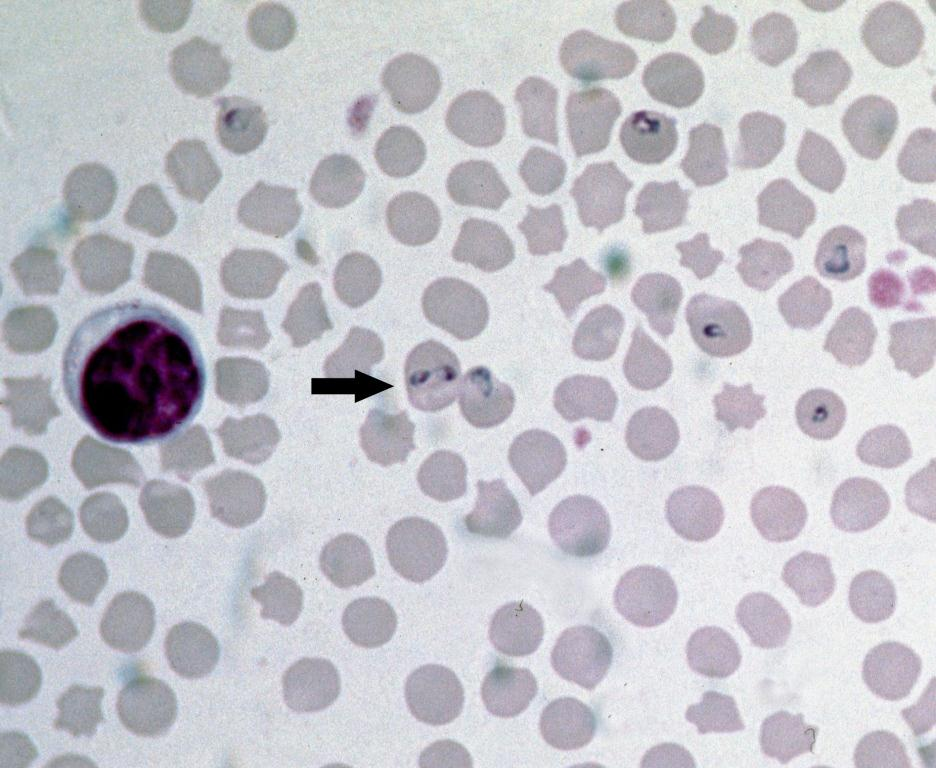

Scientific classification
- Domain: Eukaryota
- Supergroup: Alveolata
- Phylum: Apicomplexa
- Class: Aconoidasida
- Order: Piroplasmida
- Family: Babesiidae
- Genus: Babesia
- Species: B. bovis

Binomial name
- Babesia bovis V. Babes 1888

Synonyms
- B. argentina

= Babesia bovis =

Species of single-celled organism

Babesia bovis is an Apicomplexan single-celled parasite of cattle which occasionally infects humans. The disease it and other members of the genus Babesia cause is a hemolytic anemia known as babesiosis and colloquially called Texas cattle fever, redwater or piroplasmosis. It is transmitted by bites from infected larval ticks of the order Ixodida. It was eradicated from the United States by 1943, but is still present in Mexico and much of the world's tropics. The chief vector of Babesia species is the southern cattle fever tick Rhipicephalus microplus (formerly Boophilus microplus).

This parasite is predominantly found in tropical and subtropical regions, including Latin America, Africa, Australia, and parts of Asia. Its zoonotic potential is limited but significant, as rare cases of human infections have been reported, primarily in immunocompromised individuals, such as splenectomized patients. Recent studies have documented sporadic human cases, though the actual prevalence remains unclear.

In 2007, the sequence of its genome was announced. Measuring 8.2 million base pairs, its genome is remarkably similar to the genome of Theileria parva, the cause of East Coast fever (theileriosis) in cattle.

== Taxonomy and classification ==
Babesia bovis belongs to the genus Babesia, which is closely related to other apicomplexan parasites, including Theileria parva and Plasmodium species. Phylogenetic studies indicate that Babesia shares a common evolutionary lineage with these parasites, all of which are obligate intracellular organisms capable of manipulating host cells for survival and proliferation.The genus Babesia includes multiple species, with Babesia bigemina being another major pathogen affecting cattle.

== Life cycle ==
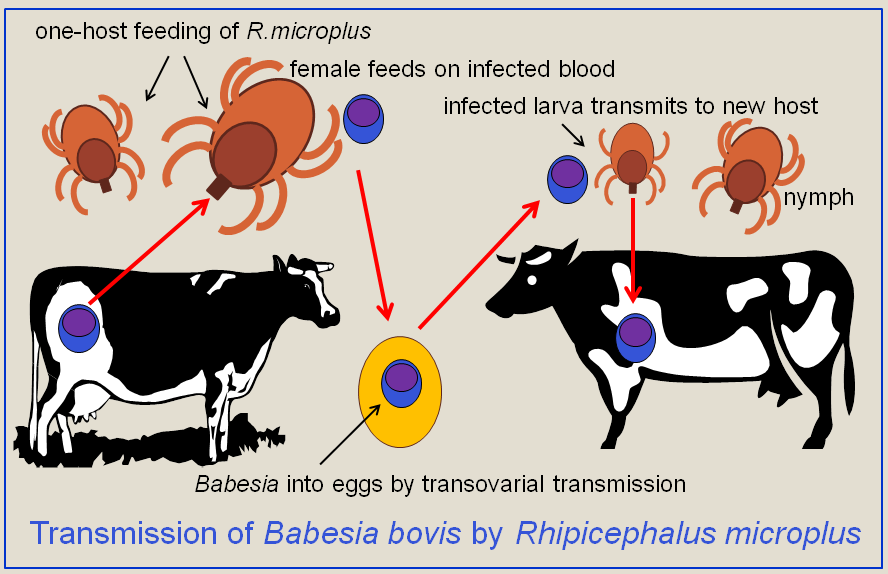
Babesia bovis disease ecology

The life cycle of Babesia bovis involves two hosts: cattle and Rhipicephalus (Boophilus) vmicroplus ticks. The cycle includes the following stages:

1. Tick ingestion – Ticks ingest B. bovis during a blood meal from an infected bovine host.
2. Sporogony in ticks – The parasite undergoes sporogonic development within the tick, including multiplication in the gut and migration to the salivary glands.
3. Transovarial transmission – Unlike some other Babesia species, B. bovis can be transmitted from adult female ticks to their offspring, ensuring persistence in tick populations.
4. Transmission to cattle – During subsequent tick feeding, B. bovis sporozoites are injected into the bovine bloodstream.
5. Erythrocytic replication – The parasite invades red blood cells, undergoes asexual reproduction, and spreads within the host.
6. Pathogen Release – Infected erythrocytes rupture, releasing merozoites that continue the infection cycle.

== Infection ==
Babesia bovis is transmitted transovarially, from the female ticks to the eggs, and can remain resident in tick populations for up to four years without infecting a vertebrate host. More commonly, a larval tick feeds upon a domestic cow, an African buffalo or a water buffalo, releasing the parasites into the animal's bloodstream. The involvement of the larval stage of the ticks in the cycle is specific to B. bovis; other Babesia species only involve adult ticks. The parasites then invade individual red blood cells, multiplying and destroying the host cells until the animal is stricken with hemolytic anemia. Adult ticks which feed upon infected cattle are infected themselves, completing the cycle. In humans, infection is rare and usually only affects splenectomized patients.

Babesia bovis causes bovine babesiosis by invading red blood cells, leading to hemolysis and an intense immune response. The major clinical signs include:

- High fever
- Severe anemia
- Jaundice
- Hemoglobinuria
- Neurological signs, often referred to as "cerebral babesiosis"

== See also ==
- List of diseases eradicated from the United States

== Diagnosis ==
Diagnostic methods for Babesia bovis include:

- Microscopy – Blood smears stained with Giemsa remain a traditional diagnostic tool.
- PCR – Polymerase chain reaction (PCR) assays offer high sensitivity and specificity.
- Serological Tests – ELISA and indirect fluorescent antibody tests (IFAT) help in detecting antibodies against B. bovis.
- Comparative Sensitivity – PCR-based methods outperform microscopy in early infection detection.

== Treatment and prevention ==
Treatment options include Imidocarb dipropionate and diminazene aceturate which have proven efficacy. Drug resistance is an emerging concern, necessitating alternative strategies.

Preventive measures involve:

- Vaccination – Both live attenuated and recombinant vaccines are under development.
- Tick Control – Chemical acaricides, biological agents, and integrated management practices help reduce tick populations.

== Genomics and molecular biology ==
Genome sequencing of Babesia bovis has identified genes involved in virulence and host immune evasion. Comparative genomic studies with Theileria parva and Plasmodium falciparum reveal shared mechanisms of intracellular survival and immune modulation.

== Economic and agricultural impact ==
Bovine babesiosis, primarily due to Babesia bovis, imposes significant financial burdens on the cattle industry, particularly in Latin America, Africa, and Australia. Economic losses stem from:

- Reduced productivity due to illness
- Mortality in susceptible cattle populations
- Costs of treatment and tick control

Government-led eradication efforts in the United States have successfully reduced B. bovis prevalence, setting a model for other regions.
