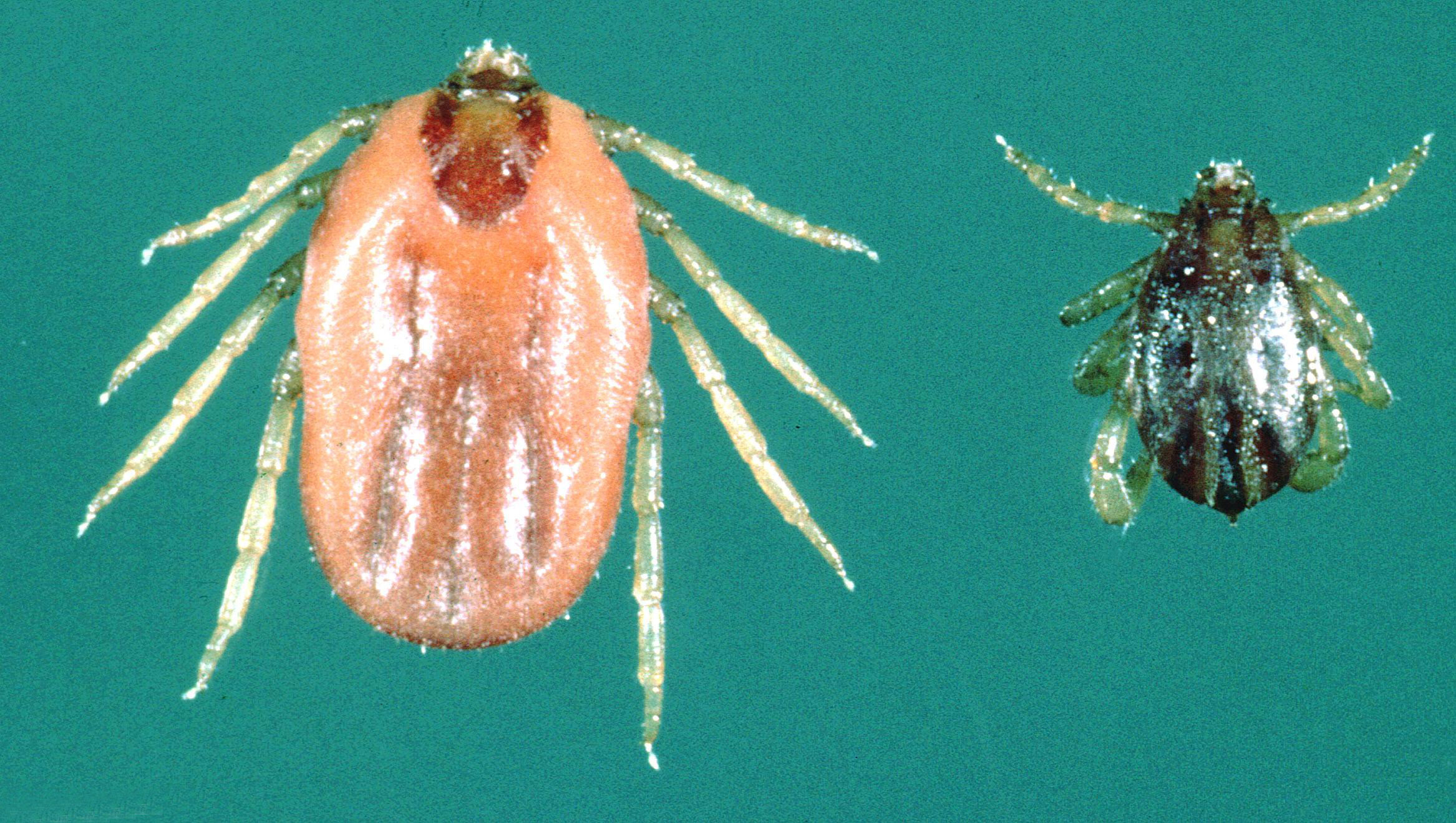
- female and male

Scientific classification
- Kingdom: Animalia
- Phylum: Arthropoda
- Subphylum: Chelicerata
- Class: Arachnida
- Order: Ixodida
- Family: Ixodidae
- Genus: Rhipicephalus
- Species: R. microplus

Binomial name
- Rhipicephalus microplus (Canestrini, 1888)

Synonyms
- Boophilus annulatus australis Lahille, 1905; Boophilus annulatus calcaratus Sharif, 1928; Boophilus annulatus caudatus Lahille, 1905; Boophilus annulatus microdus Arnold, 1935 (misapplied name); Boophilus annulatus microplus Lahille, 1905; Boophilus australis Stiles & Hassall, 1901; Boophilus caudatus Lahille, 1905; Boophilus intraoculatus Minning, 1936; Boophilus microplus Lahille, 1905; Boophilus microplus annulatus Floch, 1956; Boophilus (Margaropus) annulatus australis Toumanoff, 1944; Boophilus (Palpoboophilus) minningi Kishida, 1936; Boophilus (Uroboophilus) caudatus Minning, 1934; Boophilus (Uroboophilus) cyclops Minning, 1934; Boophilus (Uroboophilus) distans Minning, 1934; Boophilus (Uroboophilus) fallax Minning, 1934; Boophilus (Uroboophilus) krijgsmani Minning, 1934; Boophilus (Uroboophilus) longiscutatus Minning, 1934; Boophilus (Uroboophilus) microplus Minning, 1934; Boophilus (Uroboophilus) rotundiscutatus Minning, 1934; Boophilus (Uroboophilus) sharifi Minning, 1934; Haemaphysalis micropla Canestrini, 1888; Ixodes australis Ruotsalainen, 1903 (misapplied name); Margaropus annulatus argentinus Castellani & Chalmers, 1910; Margaropus annulatus australis Newstead, 1909; Margaropus annulatus caudatus Neumann, 1911; Margaropus annulatus mexicanus Macias Valadez, 1923; Margaropus annulatus microphilus Castellani & Chalmers, 1919; Margaropus annulatus microplus Rohr, 1909; Margaropus australis Manson, 1907; Margaropus caudatus Castellani & Chalmers, 1910; Margaropus microphilus Castellani & Chalmers, 1910 (misapplied name); Margaropus micropla Neumann, 1911; Margaropus microplus Hunter & Hooker, 1907; Palpoboophilus brachyuris Kishida, 1939; Palpoboophilus minningi Kishida, 1939; Rhipicaphalus annulatus caudatus Neumann, 1897; Rhipicaphalus australis Fuller, 1899; Rhipicephalus annulatus argentinensis Neumann, 1901; Rhipicephalus annulatus argentinus Neumann, 1901; Rhipicephalus annulatus australis Neumann, 1901; Rhipicephalus annulatus caudatus Neumann, 1901; Rhipicephalus annulatus microplus Neumann, 1901; Rhipicephalus annulatus microplus Neumann, 1901; Rhipicephalus caudatus Fuller, 1899; Rhipicephalus microplus Canestrini, 1890; Rhipicephalus (Boophilus) argentinus Neumann, 1904; Rhipicephalus (Boophilus) microplus; Uroboophilus australis Kishida, 1939; Uroboophilus caudatus Kishida, 1939; Uroboophilus cyclops Schulze, 1936; Uroboophilus distans Schulze, 1935; Uroboophilus fallax Kishida, 1939; Uroboophilus indicus Minning, 1936; Uroboophilus krijgsmani Kishida, 1939; Uroboophilus longiscutatus Kishida, 1939; Uroboophilus microplus Kishida, 1939; Uroboophilus occidentalis Minning, 1936; Uroboophilus rotundiscutatus Kishida, 1939; Uroboophilus sharifi Kishida, 1939; Uroboophilus sinensis Schulze, 1935

= Rhipicephalus microplus =

Species of tick

The Asian blue tick (Rhipicephalus (Boophilus) microplus, Rhipicephalus microplus, or Boophilus microplus) is an economically important tick that parasitises a variety of livestock and wild mammal species, especially cattle, on which it is the most economically significant ectoparasite in the world. It is known as the Australian cattle tick, southern cattle tick, Cuban tick, Madagascar blue tick, and Puerto Rican Texas fever tick.

It is classified as a hard tick in the family Ixodidae. It is a small teardrop-shaped arachnid with a hardened plate called the scutum covering its head. Males are entirely covered in scutum on their backs with additional plates called festoons along their sides. The body can be brown or pale in nymphs and darkens as the tick matures. Adults have eight cream-colored legs.

In R. microplus the hypostome has a hexagonal base (basis capitulum) which can be used as an identifying characteristic. Ticks may be identified by the arrangement of hair-like structures called setae. In R. microplus the setae are arranged in rows of two or three along the tick's body behind the scutum.

== Parasitism ==
Rhipicephalus microplus is best known for being a cattle parasite. However, it has also been discovered in a number of other animal hosts such as domestic water buffalo, wild and domestic goats, horses, wild pigs, various rat species, and humans.

R. microplus serves as a vector for numerous pathogens, most notably Babesia bigemina and B. bovis. B. bigemina and B. bovis are responsible for bovine babesiosis which is ranked as the most economically important arthropod-transmitted illness in cattle. Bovine babesiosis is characterized by anemia, fever, and potentially multiple organ failure. This results in weight loss and lower milk production in infected cattle and therefore, massive economic losses in countries like Brazil where 80% of the cattle population is infected. R. microplus has also been shown to be a vector for Ehrlichia ruminantium in West Africa. E. ruminantium causes fluid buildup around the heart in cattle and other species, a condition with an 80% mortality rate, causing significant economic damage in infected areas.

== Distribution ==
Rhipicephalus microplus was originally found in the tropical and sub-tropical forests of India. However, due to the centuries-long movement of cattle around Europe, R. microplus has dramatically spread from its original range, making it to the United States between four and five centuries ago. R. microplus is generally found between 32°N and 32°S, a region strongly overlapping with major cattle breeding countries and territories.

Nearly a cosmopolitan species, Asian blue tick is found specifically in Costa Rica, Anguilla, Antigua and Barbuda, Brazil, Bahamas, Barbados, Belize, Bolivia, Argentina, Colombia, Cote D'Ivoire, Cuba, Dominica, Ecuador, El Salvador, Ethiopia, French Guiana, Guadeloupe, Guam, Guatemala, Guyana, Honduras, India, Indonesia, Jamaica, Libya, Madagascar, Malawi, Martinique, Mexico, Montserrat, Mozambique, Nicaragua, Panama, Paraguay, Peru, Puerto Rico, Saint Kitts and Nevis, Saint Lucia, Saint Vincent and the Grenadines, South Africa, Sri Lanka, Suriname, Tanzania, Trinidad and Tobago, Uganda, Uruguay, Venezuela, Vietnam, Virgin Islands (U.S.), Zambia and Zimbabwe.

Tick populations in Australia once thought to belong to R. microplus are now recognized to belong to R. australis, which was reinstated as a sibling species of R. microplus in 2012.

Having formerly been present in the United States, it has since been eradicated there, except for sporadic occurrences in a buffer zone along the Mexican border.

In Louisiana, Governor Ruffin Pleasant in 1917 signed legislation sponsored by freshman State Senator Norris C. Williamson of East Carroll Parish to authorize state funding to eradicate the cattle tick.

=== Climate change ===
Some veterinary science research suggests that R. microplus could become established in the currently temperate countries once their autumns and winters become warmer by about 2–2.75 °C (3.60–4.95 °F).

== Life cycle ==
The life cycle of R. microplus has been examined under laboratory conditions using rabbit hosts. The average life cycle was determined to be approximately 65 days. The life cycle begins with an adult female which feeds for approximately seven days before entering a four-day pre-oviposition period. During pre-oviposition a female will mate with any and all males who present themselves. The female tick then spends 8.6 days in oviposition, during which time she will lay her eggs. On average, each female lays about 1450 eggs per brood. The eggs take about 21 days to hatch. Approximately 83.5% will survive to hatch into a free-living larval stage which lasts for 3.5 days. The larvae have their first feeding at this time, and their first molt eight days later. At this point, the larvae have become nymphs. They will feed for 11 days before becoming adults.

== Control ==
Management efforts in the United States began after R. microplus was deemed responsible for an estimated $63 billion in damages during the early 19th century. A control campaign began in 1906 and by 1943 it was considered complete, having eradicated most of the tick population other than a small region along the Southern US border. In the modern day, the standard form of control is spraying of acaricides: a type of pesticide that targets ticks and mites. Overuse of acaricides has resulted in some R. microplus populations developing resistance, and it is now considered the most resistant tick ever. Other control methods include ivermectin, a common anti-parasitic. In Mexico, it has been shown that R. microplus populations are developing varying levels of resistance to ivermectin, meaning this treatment is becoming less effective year over year. Recent studies in the Brazilian Amazon have identified heterogeneous resistance profiles of Rhipicephalus microplus populations to ivermectin, doramectin, and amitraz in western Pará.

Vaccinating cattle against R. microplus was considered as another option, however, the original Bm86-based vaccines have shown limited efficacy against R. microplus as compared to other tick species.

Acaricides and pyrethroids are commonly used however this has led to the development of acaricide- and pyrethroid- resistances. Acaricide resistance in R. microplus is mediated by para sodium channel mutants. Such alleles can be rapidly detected in a border livestock inspection by PCR+High Resolution Melt testing. This is especially useful on the United States-Mexico border where the US has almost eradicated R. microplus, but Mexico has a high prevalence and a high prevalence of acaricide resistance. This technique could also be applied in other countries where pyrethroid resistant R. microplus is a common problem.

Some populations of R. microplus have developed resistance to acetylcholinesterase inhibitors. The search for the acetylcholinesterase (AChE) mutations responsible has been stymied because, although there are only three AChEs in this genome, all three have a high copy number. Progress has been made by Bellgard et al., 2012, Temeyer et al., 2012, and Bendele et al., 2015 toward identifying acaricide resistance alleles.

Another management option that has shown promise is the use of pasture rotation. This is based on knowledge of the R. microplus life cycle. A large pasture is divided up into multiple regions that cattle are moved between regularly. The rotation time is based on the time it takes the R. microplus eggs to hatch. If timed correctly, the larvae in an area only become viable after the cattle have moved, leading to loss of that R. microplus generation. This has been shown to be effective in reducing the tick population. However, the amount of time a pasture needs to remain empty means it isn't generally economically viable for farmers.

In June 2024, a study explored the use of microbial agents as biological control methods against R. microplus. The research identified bacteria like Bacillus thuringiensis, Serratia marcescens, and Staphylococcus spp., as well as nematodes (Steinernema spp. and Heterorhabditis spp.) and fungi (Metarhizium anisopliae and Beauveria bassiana), as effective in controlling both susceptible and acaricide-resistant tick populations.

== See also ==
- Ticks of domestic animals
