= Babesiosis =

Malaria-like parasitic disease

- Other names: Babesiasis, Texas fever
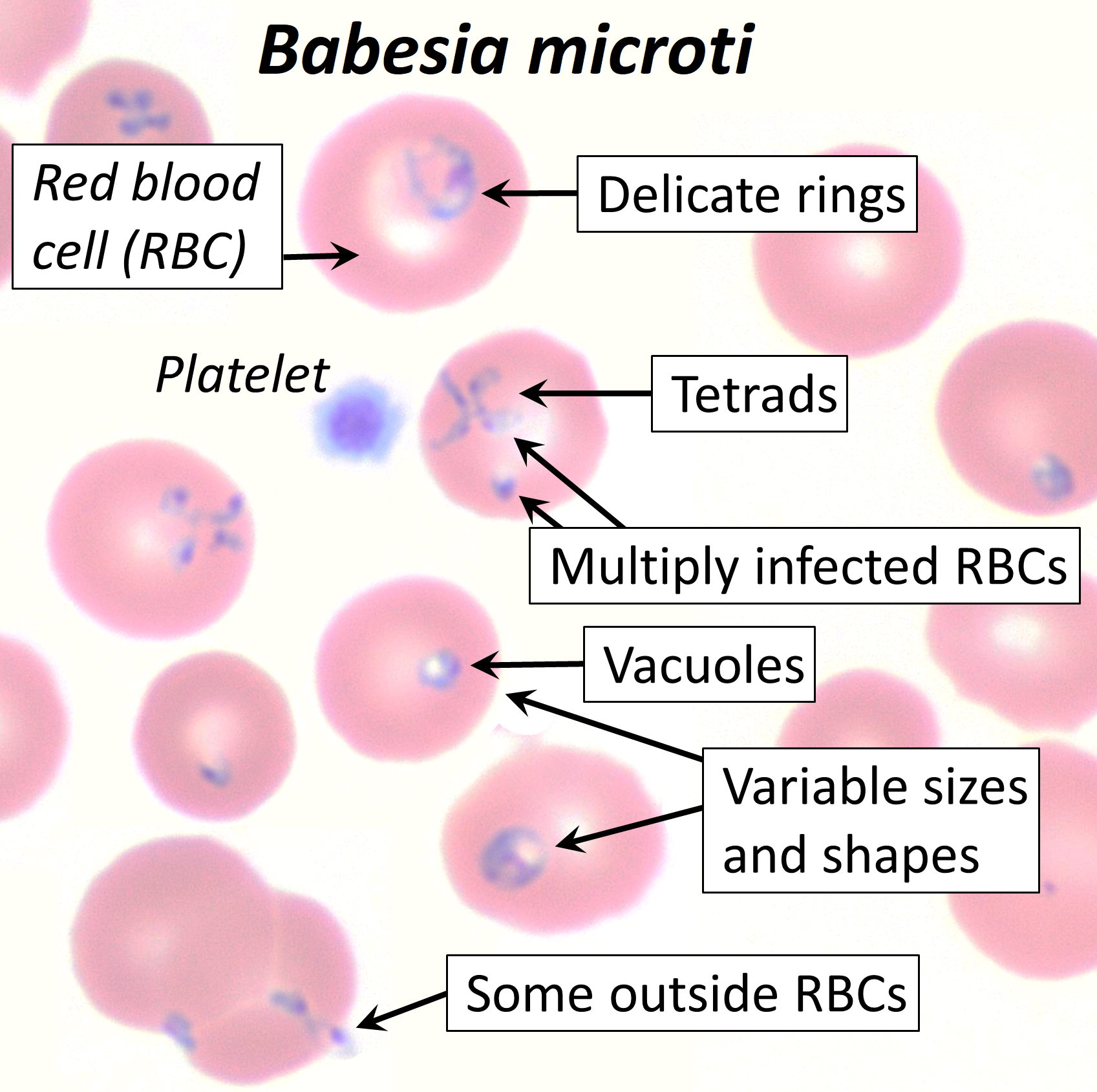
- Blood smear of Babesia microti
- Pronunciation: Babesiosis /bəbiːzɪˈoʊsɪs/, babesiasis /bæbɪˈzaɪəsɪs/
- Specialty: Infectious disease
- Symptoms: fever, chills, headache, fatigue
- Risk factors: Removed spleen (splenectomy), weakened immune system, outdoor activities
- Differential diagnosis: Malaria
- Frequency: 0.0001%

Babesiosis or piroplasmosis is a malaria-like vector-borne parasitic disease caused by infection with a eukaryotic parasite in the order Piroplasmida, typically a Babesia or Theileria, in the phylum Apicomplexa. Human babesiosis transmission via tick bite is most common in the Northeastern and Midwestern United States and parts of Europe, and sporadic throughout the rest of the world. It occurs in warm weather. People can get infected with Babesia parasites by the bite of an infected tick, by getting a blood transfusion from an infected donor of blood products, or by congenital transmission (an infected mother to her baby). Ticks transmit the human strain of babesiosis, so it often presents with other tick-borne illnesses such as Lyme disease. After trypanosomes, Babesia is thought to be the second-most common blood parasite of mammals. It can have major adverse effects on the health of domestic animals in areas without severe winters. In cattle, the disease is known as Texas cattle fever or redwater.

== Signs and symptoms ==
Half of all children and a quarter of previously healthy adults with Babesia infection are asymptomatic. When people do develop symptoms, the most common are fever and hemolytic anemia, symptoms that are similar to those of malaria. People with symptoms usually become ill 1 to 4 weeks after the bite, or 1 to 9 weeks after transfusion of contaminated blood products. A person infected with babesiosis gradually develops malaise and fatigue, followed by a fever. Hemolytic anemia, in which red blood cells are destroyed and removed from the blood, also develops. Chills, sweats, and thrombocytopenia are also common symptoms. Symptoms may last from several days to several months.

Less common symptoms and physical exam findings of mild-to-moderate babesiosis:

- Headache
- Muscle pain
- Anorexia
- Nonproductive cough (mucus is not coughed up)
- Arthralgias (noninflammatory joint pain, unlike arthritis, which is inflammatory)
- Nausea
- Vomiting
- Sore throat
- Abdominal pain
- Pink eye/Conjunctivitis
- Photophobia (abnormal intolerance to visual perception of light)
- Weight loss
- Emotional lability
- Depression
- Hyperesthesia (more sensitive to stimuli)
- Enlarged spleen
- Pharyngeal erythema
- Enlarged liver
- Jaundice (yellowing of the skin and of the sclera)
- Retinopathy with splinter hemorrhages
- Retinal infarcts
- Neutropenia

In more severe cases, symptoms similar to malaria occur, with fevers up to 40.5 °C (105 °F), shaking chills, and severe anemia (hemolytic anemia). Organ failure may follow, including adult respiratory distress syndrome. Sepsis in people who have had a splenectomy can occur rapidly, consistent with overwhelming post-splenectomy infection. Severe cases are also more likely to occur in the very young, very old, and persons with immunodeficiency, such as HIV/AIDS patients.

A reported increase in human babesiosis diagnoses in the 2000s is thought to be caused by more widespread testing and higher numbers of people with immunodeficiencies coming in contact with ticks, the disease vector. Little is known about the occurrence of Babesia species in malaria-endemic areas, where Babesia can easily be misdiagnosed as Plasmodium. Human patients with repeat babesiosis infection may exhibit premunity.

== Cause ==
Babesia species are in the phylum Apicomplexa (the same phylum as the protozoan parasites that cause malaria, toxoplasmosis, and cryptosporidiosis).

Four clades of Babesia species infect humans. The main species in each clade are:

1. B. microti (< 3 μm)
2. B. duncani
3. B. divergens (cattle parasite seen mostly in Europe) and B. venatorum (roe deer parasite, formerly called EU1), most closely related to the large Babesia clade
4. Large Babesia (> 3 μm) mostly infects ungulates, but also includes the K01 strain (an isolated case observed in South Korea)

== Pathophysiology ==
Babesia lifecycle

Babesia parasites reproduce in red blood cells, where they can be seen as plus-shaped inclusions (four merozoites asexually budding, but attached forming a structure looking like a "Maltese cross") and cause hemolytic anemia, quite similar to malaria.

Unlike the Plasmodium parasites that cause malaria, Babesia species rarely exhibit an exoerythrocytic phase with trophozoite forms.

In nonhuman animals, Babesia canis rossi, Babesia bigemina, and Babesia bovis cause particularly severe forms of the disease, including severe haemolytic anaemia, with positive erythrocyte-in-saline-agglutination test indicating an immune-mediated component to the haemolysis. Common sequelae include haemoglobinuria "red-water", disseminated intravascular coagulation, and "cerebral babesiosis" caused by sludging of erythrocytes in cerebral capillaries.

In bovine species, the organism causes hemolytic anemia, so an infected animal shows pale mucous membranes initially. As the levels of bilirubin (a byproduct of red blood cell lysis) continue to increase, the visible mucous membranes become yellow (icterus) due to the failure of the liver to metabolize the excess bilirubin. Hemoglobinuria is seen due to the excretion of red-blood-cell lysis byproducts via the kidneys. A fever of 40.5 °C (105 °F) develops due to the release of inflammatory byproducts.

== Diagnosis ==
Only specialized laboratories can adequately diagnose Babesia infection in humans, so Babesia infections are considered highly under-reported. It develops in patients who live in or travel to an endemic area or receive a contaminated blood transfusion within the preceding 9 weeks, so this aspect of the medical history is vital. Babesiosis may be suspected when a person with such an exposure history develops persistent fevers and hemolytic anemia. The definitive diagnostic test is the identification of parasites on a Giemsa-stained thin-film blood smear.

So-called "Maltese cross formations" on the blood film are diagnostic (pathognomonic) of babesiosis since they are not seen in malaria, the primary differential diagnosis. Careful examination of multiple smears may be necessary, since Babesia may infect less than 1% of circulating red blood cells, thus be easily overlooked.

Serologic testing for antibodies against Babesia (both IgG and IgM) can detect low-level infection in cases with high clinical suspicion, but negative blood film examinations. Serology is also useful for differentiating babesiosis from malaria in cases where people are at risk for both infections. Since detectable antibody responses require about a week after infection to develop, serologic testing may be falsely negative early in the disease course.

A polymerase chain reaction (PCR) test has been developed for the detection of Babesia from the peripheral blood. PCR may be at least as sensitive and specific as blood-film examination in diagnosing babesiosis, though it is also significantly more expensive. Most often, PCR testing is used in conjunction with blood film examination and possibly serologic testing.

Other laboratory findings include decreased numbers of red blood cells and platelets on complete blood count.

In animals, babesiosis is suspected by observation of clinical signs (hemoglobinuria and anemia) in animals in endemic areas. Diagnosis is confirmed by observation of merozoites on a thin film blood smear examined at maximum magnification under oil using Romonovski stains (methylene blue and eosin). This is a routine part of the veterinary examination of dogs and ruminants in regions where babesiosis is endemic.

Babesia canis and B. bigemina are "large Babesia species" that form paired merozoites in the erythrocytes, commonly described as resembling "two pears hanging together", rather than the "Maltese cross" of the "small Babesia species". Their merozoites are around twice the size of small ones.

Cerebral babesiosis is suspected in vivo when neurological signs (often severe) are seen in cattle that are positive for B. bovis on blood smear, but this has yet to be proven scientifically. Outspoken red discoloration of the grey matter post-mortem further strengthens suspicion of cerebral babesiosis. Diagnosis is confirmed post-mortem by observation of Babesia-infected erythrocytes sludged in the cerebral cortical capillaries in a brain smear.

== Treatment ==
Treatment of asymptomatic carriers should be considered if parasites are still detected after 3 months. In mild-to-moderate babesiosis, the treatment of choice is a combination of atovaquone and azithromycin. This regimen is preferred to clindamycin and quinine because it has fewer side effects. The standard course is 7 to 10 days, but this is extended to at least 6 weeks in people with relapsing disease. Even mild cases are recommended to be treated to decrease the chance of inadvertently transmitting the infection by donating blood. In severe babesiosis, the combination of clindamycin and quinine is preferred. In life-threatening cases, exchange transfusion is performed. In this procedure, the infected red blood cells are removed and replaced with uninfected ones; toxins produced by the parasites may also be removed.

Imidocarb is a drug used for the treatment of babesiosis in dogs. Extracts of the poisonous, bulbous plant Boophone disticha are used in the folk medicine of South Africa to treat equine babesiosis. B. disticha is a member of the daffodil family Amaryllidaceae and has also been used in preparations employed as arrow poisons, hallucinogens, and in embalming. The plant is rich in alkaloids, some of which display an action similar to that of scopolamine.

== Epidemiology ==
Babesiosis is a vector-borne illness usually transmitted by Ixodes scapularis ticks. B. microti uses the same tick vector as Lyme disease, and may occur in conjunction with Lyme. The organism can also be transmitted by blood transfusion. Ticks of domestic animals, especially Rhipicephalus (Boophilus) microplus and R. (B.) decoloratus transmit several species of Babesia to livestock, causing considerable economic losses to farmers in tropical and subtropical regions.

In the United States, the majority of babesiosis cases are caused by B. microti, and occur in the Northeast and northern Midwest from May through October. Areas with especially high rates include eastern Long Island, Fire Island, Nantucket Island, and Martha's Vineyard. The Centers for Disease Control and Prevention now requires state health departments to report infections using Form OMB No. 0920-0728. In 2014, Rhode Island had an incidence of 16.3 reported infections per 100,000 people.

In Europe, B. divergens is the primary cause of infectious babesiosis and is transmitted by I. ricinus.

Babesiosis has emerged in the Lower Hudson Valley, New York, since 2001.

In Australia, one locally-acquired case of B. microti has been reported, which was fatal. A subsequent investigation found no additional evidence of human babesiosis in over 7000 patient samples, leading the authors to conclude that babesiosis was rare in Australia. A similar disease in cattle, commonly known as tick fever, is spread by Babesia bovis and B. bigemina in the introduced cattle tick Rhipicephalus microplus. This disease is found in eastern and northern Australia.

=== Isolated cases ===
A table of isolated cases of babesiosis, which may be underestimated given how widely distributed the tick vectors are in temperate latitudes.

Location	Species
Pacific Coast (northern California to Washington)	B. duncani
Kentucky, Missouri, and Washington	B. divergens
Austria, Germany, Italy	B. venatorum
Canary Islands	B. microti
Africa (Egypt, Mozambique, South Africa)	Uncharacterized spp.
Asia (Taiwan, Japan)	B. microti
South Korea	Babesia KO1
Australia	B. microti
South America (Brazil, Colombia)	Uncharacterized spp.

== History ==
The disease is named for the genus of the causative organism, which was named after the Romanian bacteriologist Victor Babeș. In 1888, Victor Babeș identified the microorganisms in red blood cells as the cause of febrile hemoglobinuria in cattle. In 1893, Theobald Smith and Frederick Kilborne discovered that a tick was the vector for transmission in Texas cattle. The agent was B. bigemina. This was the first demonstration that an arthropod could act as a disease vector to transmit an infectious agent to a vertebrate host.

In 1957, the first human case was documented in a splenectomized Croatian herdsman. The agent was B. divergens. In 1969, the first case was reported in an immunocompetent individual on Nantucket Island. The agent was B. microti, and the vector was the tick I. scapularis. Equine babesiosis (caused by the protozoan Theileria equi) is also known as piroplasmosis (from the Latin piro, meaning pear + Greek plasma, a thing formed).

== Other animals ==
Veterinary treatment of babesiosis does not normally use antibiotics. In livestock and animals, diminazen (Berenil), imidocarb, or trypan blue would be the drugs of choice for treatment of B. canis rossi (dogs in Africa), B. bovis, and B. bigemina (cattle in Southern Africa). In acute cases in cattle, a blood transfusion may be carried out. A vaccine is effective against B. canis canis (dogs in the Mediterranean region), but is ineffective against B. c. rossi. B. imitans causes a mild form of the disease that frequently resolves without treatment (dogs in Southeast Asia).
