= Babesia bigemina =

Scientific classification
- Domain: Eukaryota
- Supergroup: Alveolata
- Phylum: Apicomplexa
- Class: Aconoidasida
- Order: Piroplasmida
- Family: Babesiidae
- Genus: Babesia
- Species: B. bigemina

Binomial name
- Babesia bigemina (Smith et Kilborne, 1893) Wenyon, 1926

Species of single-celled organism

Babesia bigemina is a species of alveolates belonging to the phylum Apicomplexa and the family Babesiidae, a type of protozoan parasite. In cattle, it causes babesiosis, also called "Texas fever". Its length is 4–5 μm and its width is 2–3 μm. Usually, it has an oval shape. In blood cells, it is located midsagittally and can reach up to two-thirds of the diameter of the blood cell in size. It is transmitted by Boophilus ticks which are prevalent in the tropics. The genome for B. bigemina is incomplete and unassembled.

It is the causative agent of babesiosis or cattle fever, a devastating disease to naive cattle with the ability to quickly kill its hosts. Ticks in the genus Rhipicephalus (Rh. microplus, Rh. boophilus) are main intermediate hosts and vectors. Because tick populations persist globally, B. bigemina prevalence has also persisted, causing hardship and economic loss to the cattle industry .

== Life cycle ==
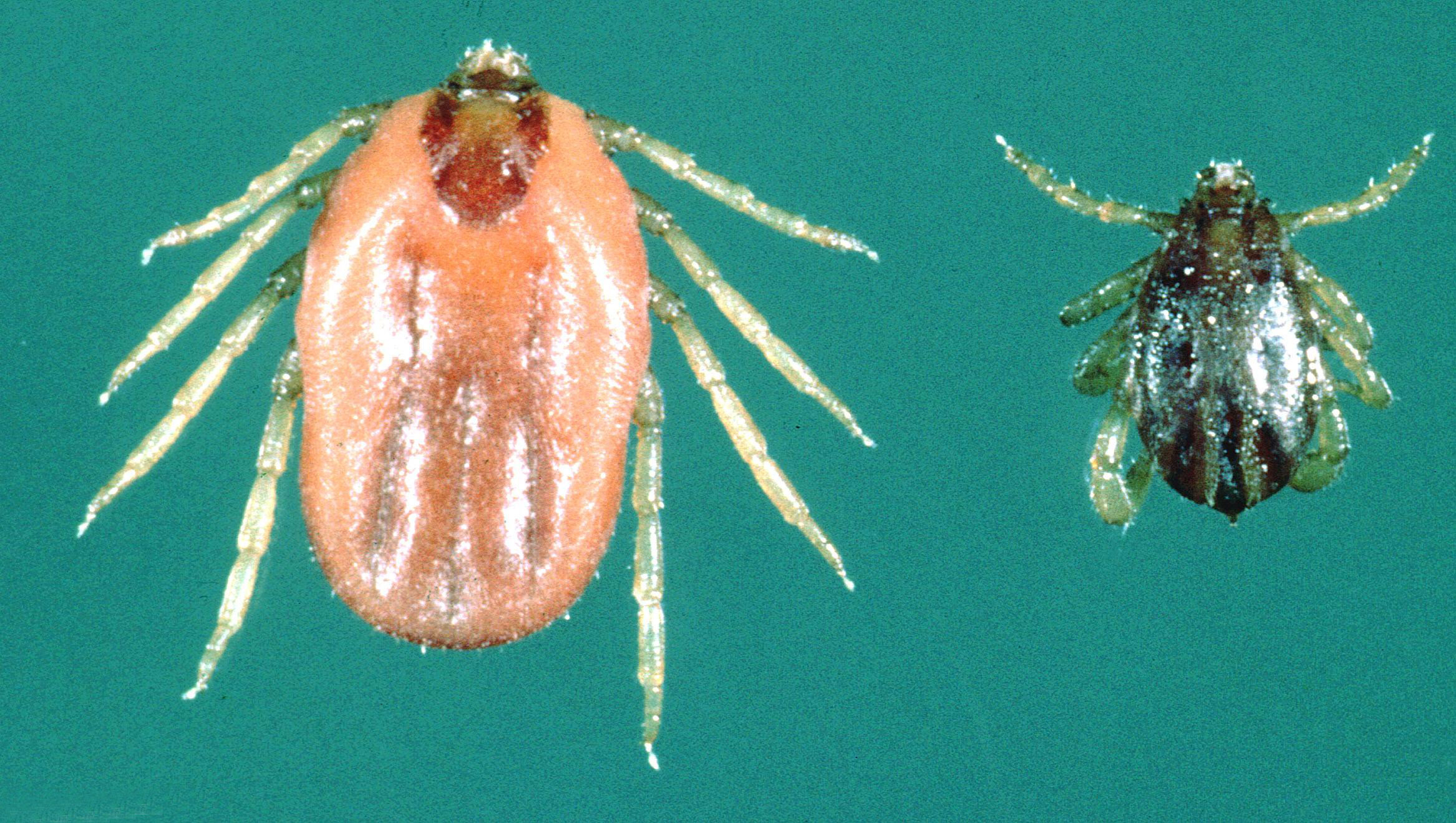
Rhipicephalus microplus, a vector for B. bigemina. Female on left, male on right

The life cycle of B. bigemina starts at the site of a tick bite by a Rhipicephalus microplus or Rh. boophilus. When ticks bite their cattle host, they regurgitate the contents of their midgut as they suck the blood of the host to feed and emit sporozoites into the cow. A sporozoite is an early form in the lifecycle of a parasite that is often the infective stage that gets into the body of a host.

The sporozoites invade the red blood cells of the cow and begin to asexually reproduce by binary fission and the parasite develops into a trophozoite stage. This is followed by the production of male and female gametes. If another tick bites the cow, the blood meal may containing gametes. In the midgut of the tick, the gametes will combine and create a zygote and migrate toward the salivary glands of the tick where sporogony will occur and sporozoites will develop. The cycle will then repeat.

== Prevalence ==
Babesia bigemina and other members of the Babesia species are widespread parasites that infect numerous hosts, with devastating effects to the public health initiative known as One Health, and economic losses in the cattle industry. A study conducted in 2004 with a sample size of twenty-seven calves and twenty-five cattle determined that 92.6% of calves and 100% of cattle had Babesia bigemina signal in optimized polymerase chain reaction (PCR) assays.

B. bigemina had a higher rate of infection in calves when compared to its counterparts within the Babesia genus, which means that young calves, who are naive and have not developed many immunologic responses, are very susceptible to this pathogen and die after infection. This makes it difficult to raise cattle in areas inhabited by Rhipicephalus ticks. This highlights the need for alternative methods of tick population control, as control the vector of the disease controls the pathogen.

== Babesiosis ==

Babesiosis, also known as cattle fever, is a disease of the blood caused by the etiological agent Babesia bigemina in cattle. When introduced to a cow by an infected tick bite, the parasite begins to endure asexual reproduction within the red blood cells, eventually causing the red blood cells to burst with multiple trophozoites. At a certain level, the parasite has continuously reproduced and caused many of the cow's red blood cells to burst leading to hemolytic anemia.

Hemolytic anemia is the condition by which red blood cells are unable to reproduce as fast as they are being destroyed, oftentimes causing a major fever, nausea, fatigue, etc. If caught early, the disease can be treated with the use of diminazene, although it is sometimes difficult to catch in cows that are sick and for ranchers that do not have access to diagnostic testing for detetction of Babesia bigemina. In previous decades, the methods of detection involved serosurveys for antibody detection, as well as blood smears. Although PCR assays have been developed to detect Babesia bigemina in extracted DNA samples, and many sequencing efforts have been put into development in order to determine phylogenetic diversity of the pathogen.

== Eradication ==
As the One Health initiative expands, the importance of understanding Babesia bigemina and tick population control is increasingly important. As global climate change occurs and temperatures rise, animal and human populations are at risk for infection and death by emerging vector-borne diseases.

The ecological complexity of ecosystems are subject to shifting by the introduction of invasive tick species and pathogens spreading around the world, like the Rhipicephalus spp. that are invasive to southern Texas. Currently, the only ways to eradicate tick populations involves chemical pesticides, but these are not globally regulated and are becoming less and less effective over the years. Evolutionary resistance mutations in the voltage-gated sodium channel (VGSC) genes that lead to amino acid replacements and encode protein changes are becoming more prevalent, so the need for alternative methods of control is on the rise so that the associated pathogens can also be controlled.
