= Eric Robinson (veterinarian) =

South African veterinarian (1891–1982)

Eric Maxwell Robinson
- Born: 12 October 1891; Market Deeping, Lincolnshire, England
- Died: 28 June 1982 (aged 90); Knysna, Western Cape, South Africa
- Education: MRCVS, Dr. Med. Vet., DVSc
- Alma mater: Royal Veterinary College, London
- Occupation: Veterinarian
- Known for: First son of a veterinarian in South Africa to qualify as a veterinarian and one of the longest serving editors of the S.A.V.A. Journal
- Spouse: Bergit Osmundsen
- Children: John Eric Robinson, Britha Nora Wacher
- Parent(s): John Andrew Robinson, Alice Brown

Eric Maxwell Robinson FRCVS (1891 – 1982) was a South African veterinarian. He was born in Market Deeping, Lincolnshire, England and came to Knysna, South Africa in 1901 to join his parents. He was the son of John Andrew Robinson MRCVS (Edinburgh 1885) (4 March 1864 – 3 September 1915).

== Early life and education ==
After he passed his matric at Mossel Bay he went on to study at the Royal Veterinary College, London where he obtained his MRCVS in 1912. This made him the first son of a veterinarian in South Africa to qualify as a veterinarian.

After this, he practiced for one year in England and then returned to South Africa to work as an assistant to the renowned Sir Arnold Theiler at Onderstepoort. Between 1913 and 1919 he conducted research on tuberculosis, contagious abortion and botulism.

== Career ==
In 1920, he travelled to the Veterinary High School, Berne where he obtained his doctoral degree of Dr. Med. Vet. for his thesis titled "The carrier in bovine contagious abortion". Upon returning to South Africa, he was placed in charge of the Allerton Veterinary Laboratory, Pietermaritzburg where he stayed until 1922. While at Allerton he conducted research on the serology of trypanasomias, which he later continued at the Onderstepoort Veterinary Faculty.

In 1922, he was appointed Lecturer in Bacteriology at the Veterinary Faculty at Onderstepoort. He held this position until 1928 when he was appointed Professor of infectious diseases until his retirement at the end of 1951. Alongside his academic duties, he earned the degree of Doctor of Veterinary Science (DVSc) from the University of South Africa for his thesis titled "The bacteria of the Clostridium botulinum C and D types". In 1929, he was also director of the Bacterial Vaccine Section at Onderstepoort and in 1931 he was appointed as Sub–Director of Veterinary Services. In 1947, he rose to the rank of Assistant Director and in April 1951 to the rank of Deputy Director.

== Marriage ==
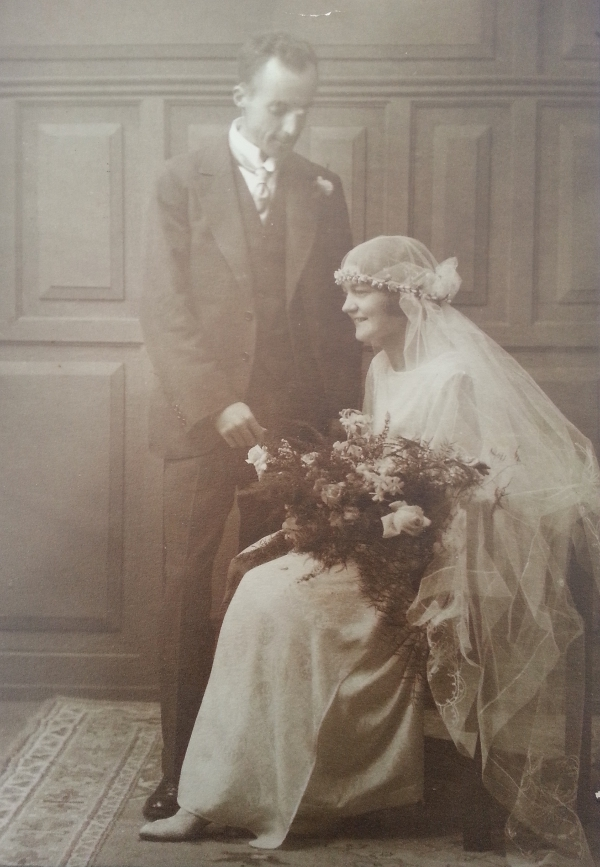
Robinson and Bergit Osmundsen on the day of their marriage.

Robinson married Miss Bergit Osmundsen on 18 June 1924 and of the two children born of this marriage (John Eric 18 April 1925 and Britha Nora 30 March 1928), John Robinson graduated as a veterinarian at Onderstepoort in 1949. Britha married D.C.L. Wacher, who was also a graduate of Onderstepoort (BVSc 1951). Mrs Robinson died in July 1949 and on 15 December 1951 Eric remarried to Miss Dorothy Amy Proctor.

== Retirement ==
On 31 December 1956, Robinson retired from his duties with the Onderstepoort faculty, but served as a temporary State Veterinarian until 31 March 1958 when he retired and joined the South African Bureau of Standards as a temporary Assistant Technical Officer. He remained in this position until his final retirement in January 1960 whereafter he settled down at Knysna. That same year he established the first private veterinary practice in Knysna, and in 1977, when a younger colleague also established himself there, he was happy to step down from active practice and to concentrate on animal welfare duties. He had served as an animal welfare inspector from 1970 to 1977.

== Public offices and awards ==
- 1931 – President of the South African Biological society
- 1932 – President of Section C of the South African Association for the advancement of Science
- 1935 – Member of the Council of the South African Veterinary Association (S.A.V.A.)
- 1937 – Awarded the Senior Captain Scott Medal for Scientific Research by the South African Biological Society
- 1940–1945 & 1951–958 – Served as Editor of the S.A.V.A. Journal
- 1945 – President of the Pretoria Rotary Club
- 1978 – Awarded the Gold Medal of the S.A.V.A.
- 1981 – Awarded the Paul Harris award for his services to Rotary

== Death and autobiography ==
Robinson died in Knysna on 28 June 1982 having just completed writing up his life history in a manuscript three days before. His students remember him as being a quiet, gentlemanly and respected teacher.

== Selected works ==
- "Serological investigations into some diseases of domesticated animals in South Africa caused by Trypanosomes". 11th & 12th Reports of the Director of Veterinary Education and Research (Report). Union of South Africa: Department of Agriculture. 1926. pp. 9–25.
- "Preliminary investigations into an icterus of sheep caused by a bacterium (bacterial icterus)". 13th and 14th Reports of the Director of Veterinary Education and Research - Part 2, October 1928 (Report). Union of South Africa: Department of Agriculture. 1928. pp. 733–741. hdl:2263/13653.
- Botulism in the domesticated animals in South Africa. Proceedings of the 1929 Pan African Veterinary Conference. Pretoria, South Africa. 1929. hdl:2263/13764.
