= Petrus Johann du Toit =

South African veterinary scientist

- Born: 16 March 1888; Somerset West
- Died: 13 November 1967 (aged 79)
- Education: Stellenbosch University
- Known for: Genootskap van Regte Afrikaners
- Awards: Fellow of the Royal Society (1951)

Petrus Johann du Toit (16 March 1888 – 13 November 1967) was a South African veterinary scientist and the successor of Arnold Theiler as Director of Veterinary Services at Onderstepoort between 1927 and 1948. He was the son of Daniel Francois du Toit (1846–1923), one of the founders of the Genootskap van Regte Afrikaners, and owner of the first Afrikaans newspaper, Die Patriot. His mother was Margaretha Magdalene van Nierop.

== Education ==
Having completed his schooling, du Toit went to Victoria College in Stellenbosch, and then to Zurich where he qualified as a Doctor of zoology in 1912 and as Doctor of veterinary science in Berlin in 1916. He spent a further three years studying the tropical diseases affecting domestic animals, publishing Tropenkrankheiten der Haustiere in 1921 together with Paul Knuth.

== Career ==
Early in his career du Toit was recognised for his exceptional scientific talent. Whereas Theiler had dominated research projects at Onderstepoort, du Toit had the gift of being able to delegate research to inspired workers. His friendly nature and his brilliance as a speaker led to his inclusion on many boards and committees and did much to improve the role of science in South African and international affairs.

From 1908 until the 1950s, after which many enzootic and epizootic diseases had been exterminated or controlled, Onderstepoort revealed the etiology and provenance of diseases such as lamsiekte, geeldikkop (a photodynamic disease of southern African sheep, caused by the ingestion of certain plants and a consequent sensitisation to light, causing intense jaundice and facial edema) and African horsesickness, and produced vaccines, some of which were globally adopted. The philosophy of the institute became increasingly holistic. The state of the veld and pastures was recognised as being pivotal in the prevention and control of disease and the maintenance of animal health.

In 1944 du Toit turned down a request from the US Department of Health for samples of the heartwater rickettsia. He made this decision based on the fact that 'heartwater is an exclusively African disease and I am of opinion that the task of solving the many problems connected with this disease should in the first place devolve on African scientists'.

"I realize of course that a scientific problem can never be any one person's preserve; that competition and even duplication of work may sometimes be very desirable; and yet I feel that in this instance I ought to protect the men who have struggled against the odds and are beginning to see daylight in a very complicated problem, which is of immense economic importance to South Africa."

Under Theiler and du Toit Onderstepoort Veterinary Institute made enormous contributions to veterinary science. Notable were the etiology of the cattle disease lamsiekte and the development of a successful vaccine against African horse sickness. By the end of the 1940s two major curses of Africa had virtually been eliminated – East Coast fever, a tick-borne disease, and nagana, spread by the tsetse fly. Onderstepoort led the way in research into phytotoxins. During World War II South Africa supplied horsesickness vaccines to the British forces in Egypt and the Middle East, and played a large part in the rinderpest inoculation campaign in Tanganyika, managing to stop its southward spread.

== Honours and publications ==
Du Toit was President of the South African Veterinary Association (SAVA) from 1924 to 1930, President of the South African Biological Society in 1927 and President of the Southern African Association for the Advancement of Science in 1932. He was President of the Council for Scientific and Industrial Research and Dean of the University of Pretoria Faculty of Veterinary Science. In 1929, he was Chairman of a Pan-African Veterinary Conference and from 1950 to 1960 he was President of the Scientific Council for Africa. He was awarded a BA degree (Zool) from the University of Stellenbosch (US) in 1907. He enjoyed honorary memberships of scientific societies in France, the United Kingdom and Belgium, and received six honorary doctorates. He collaborated with Sir Arnold Theiler on the etiology of bovine botulism. He contributed to the development of polyvalent horse sickness and bluetongue vaccines, and determined Culicoides spp as vectors of these diseases. He helped develop vaccines against anthrax and botulism and the immunisation procedure against heartwater. In all he authored or co-authored 132 publications.
