= Terry Pearson (immunologist) =

Canadian biochemist, immunologist, educator and biotechnology entrepreneur

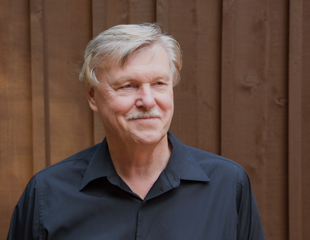
Terry William Pearson

Terry William Pearson (born February 2, 1946) is a Canadian biochemist, immunologist, educator and biotechnology entrepreneur.

== Early life and education ==
A son of Francis Lawrence Pearson and Isobel Madeline Mae Pearson (née Lovelace), he was born Terry William Pearson in Vernon, in the Okanagan Valley of British Columbia. After completing high school in Vernon, he attended the University of British Columbia intending to major in English literature. He failed his first-year English course and then studied microbiology and immunology, earning a Bachelor's of Science degree with honors in 1967. Pearson subsequently completed his PhD at the University of British Columbia under the supervision of Dr. Julia Levy and Dr. Doug Kilburn, graduating in 1973 with his thesis “Studies of the molecular requirements for lymphocyte stimulation in cellular immune responses.”

== Career ==
Pearson pursued postdoctoral work at the MRC Laboratory of Molecular Biology in Cambridge, England where he worked for 3 years with future Nobel Prize laureate Sydney Brenner and Dr. Edwin Lennox, who was one of the founders of the Salk Institute for Biological Studies, on the immunology and genetics of chemically induced tumours. Pearson's research led to a collaboration with a fellow postdoc, Georges Kohler, and supervisor César Milstein to develop monoclonal antibodies specific for cell surface antigens. He developed the first commercial monoclonal antibody, which was an antibody specific for immunoglobulin D (IgD). The hybridoma technology was not patented by the British Government as it was deemed to have no obvious application and the anti-IgD hybridoma was thus traded to an antibody company in exchange for four bottles of fetal calf serum. As of 2017, the monoclonal antibody industry was estimated to be worth over US$131 billion. In 1984, Kohler and Milstein were awarded the Nobel Prize in Physiology or Medicine for developing monoclonal antibody technology.

In 1977, Pearson was recruited by the International Laboratory for Research on Animal Diseases (ILRAD) in Nairobi, Kenya, as part of a global effort to apply new technologies to neglected tropical diseases. Pearson brought monoclonal antibody technology to Africa. His research initiated in Kenya continued for more than forty years and focused on understanding antigenic variation and immune responses to the extracellular African trypanosomes that cause trypanosomiasis and Theileria parva, the intracellular parasites that cause East Coast fever.

In 1979, he returned to British Columbia as an assistant professor in the Department of Biochemistry and Microbiology at the University of Victoria, later becoming full professor. His research in Victoria continued to focus on tropical diseases, mainly on characterization of molecules of the life cycle stages of African trypanosomes that reside in the tsetse fly. Pearson is a dedicated mentor to dozens of students and is famous for saying, “no problem in science is trivial.” In 2015, Pearson retired from the University of Victoria and is now Professor Emeritus. Throughout his career he was involved as a director and advisor for several organizations including: Director, Science Council of British Columbia 1980-1986; Trustee, and Director, Terry Fox Medical Research Foundation, Vancouver B.C., 1983–1991; Faculty of the Canadian National Reference Service for Parasitology, McGill University, Montreal, Quebec, 1984-1999 and Member of the board of trustees and executive committee, The Biomedical Research Centre, UBC, Vancouver, B.C. 1986–1991.

=== Technology and product development ===
Pearson developed methods for high-resolution analysis of complex protein mixtures using multiple two-dimensional gel electrophoresis and monoclonal antibodies with Dr. N. Leigh Anderson. In 2004, Pearson, Anderson and their colleagues developed Stable Isotope Standards and Capture by Anti-Peptide Antibodies (SISCAPA), that allows quantitation of biomarkers in complex molecular mixtures such as human plasma. This has allowed a new mass spectrometric approach to longitudinal biomarker quantitation that is receiving attention worldwide as a diagnostic tool in health and disease. Pearson is the Chief Scientific Officer and co-founder, with Dr. N. Leigh Anderson and Constance Seniff, of SISCAPA Assay Technologies, Inc.

Pearson presented this technology at a TEDx Vancouver event in 2015.

== Awards and honours ==
Pearson received the University of Victoria Inaugural Faculty of Science Excellence in Teaching Award in 1995, the Wardle Award for contributions to Canadian Parasitology (Canadian Society for Zoology) in 2004, the UVic Craigdarroch Gold Medal Award for Career Achievement in 2010 and the UVic Legacy Award for Research in 2010.

== Personal life ==
Pearson's interest in global health and application of immunology and biochemistry to medicine has led him to travel the world and to live for a long period in Kenya. He was married to Elizabeth Anne Pearson, a retired teacher who in 1990 created the African Children's Book Box Society in Kenya and in 2006 expanded it to Tanzania with Ruth James. She died in January, 2021 after a battle with cancer. Together, the Pearsons have two daughters, Katie Malaika Cubitt-Cooke and Lauren Naivasha Pearson.
