= Shark Wranglers =

- Starring: Chris Fischer; Brett McBride; Jody Whitworth; Denny Wagner; Todd Goggins; Alex Snow; Ryan Johnson; Juan Valencia; Luis Torres
- Country of origin: United States
- Original language: English
- No. of seasons: 1
- No. of episodes: 10

Production
- Executive producers: Chris Fischer; Dirk Hoogstra; Ethan Prochnik; Matt Renner; Mike Stiller
- Production companies: Fischer Productions; Undertow Films

Original release
- Network: History
- Release: July 1, 2012 – present

Shark Wrangler is an American reality television series on History. The series debuted on July 1, 2012.

A similar series aired on the National Geographic Channel, first as "Expedition Great White" in 2010, and then as "Shark Men" a year later.

== Cast ==
- Chris Fischer
- Brett McBride
- Jody Whitworth
- Denny Wagner
- Todd Goggins
- Alex Snow
- Ryan Johnson
- Juan Valencia
- Luis Torres

== Episodes ==
No.	Title	Original release date	U.S. viewers (millions)
1	"Killer Catch"	July 1, 2012	1.476
2	"Bay of the Fighting Sharks"	July 8, 2012	1.111
3	"The Curse of Maya"	July 15, 2012	1.098
4	"Monster of Bird Island"	July 22, 2012	N/A
5	"Line of Fire"	July 29, 2012	N/A
6	"Shark Alley"	August 5, 2012	N/A
7	"Friday the 13th"	August 12, 2012	N/A
8	"Bay of the Giants"	August 19, 2012	N/A
9	"Redemption"	August 26, 2012	N/A
10	"Never Give Up"	September 2, 2012	N/A
