= Mossel Bay =

Town in Western Cape, South Africa

Mossel Bay Mosselbaai
- Town
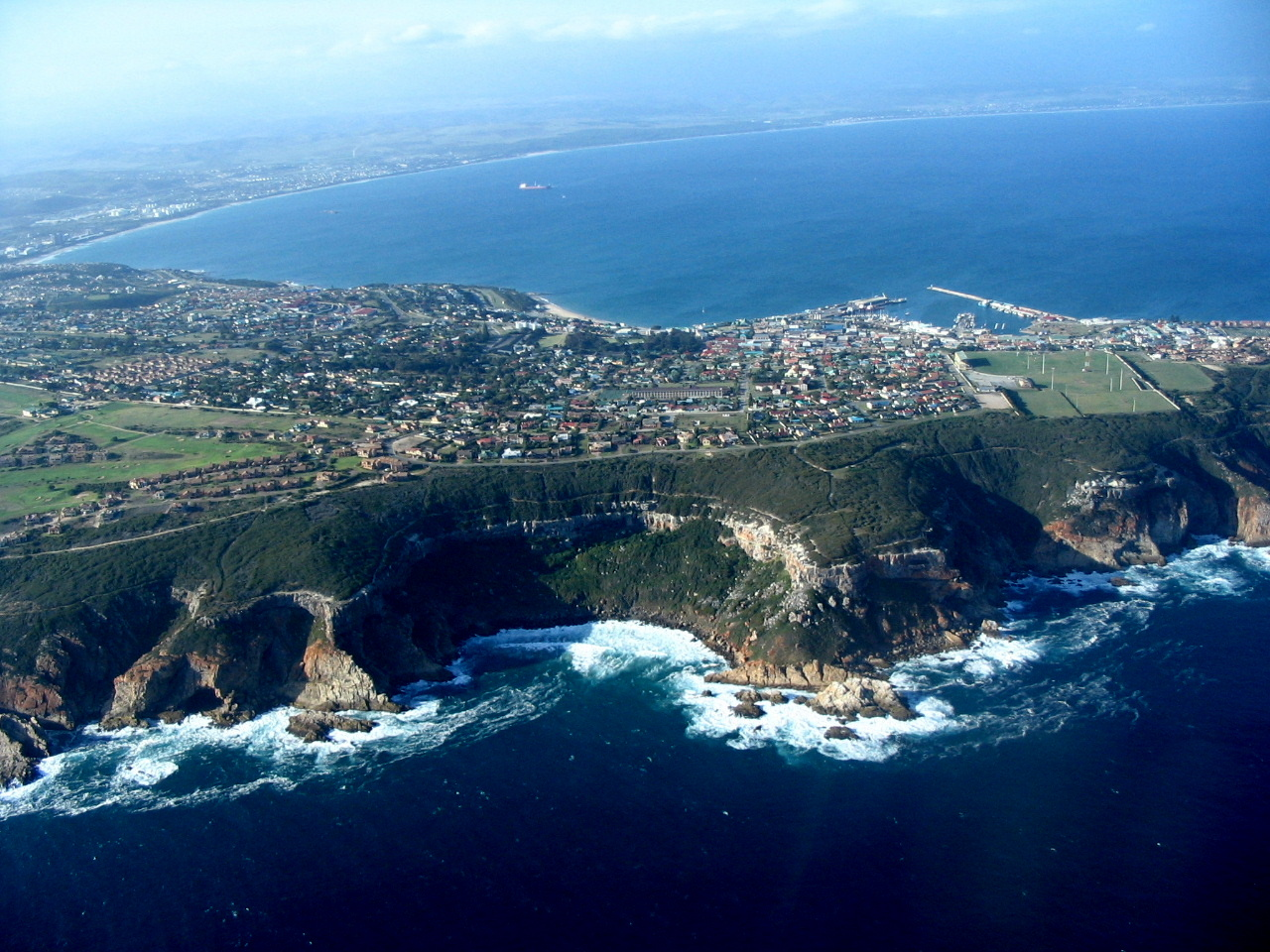
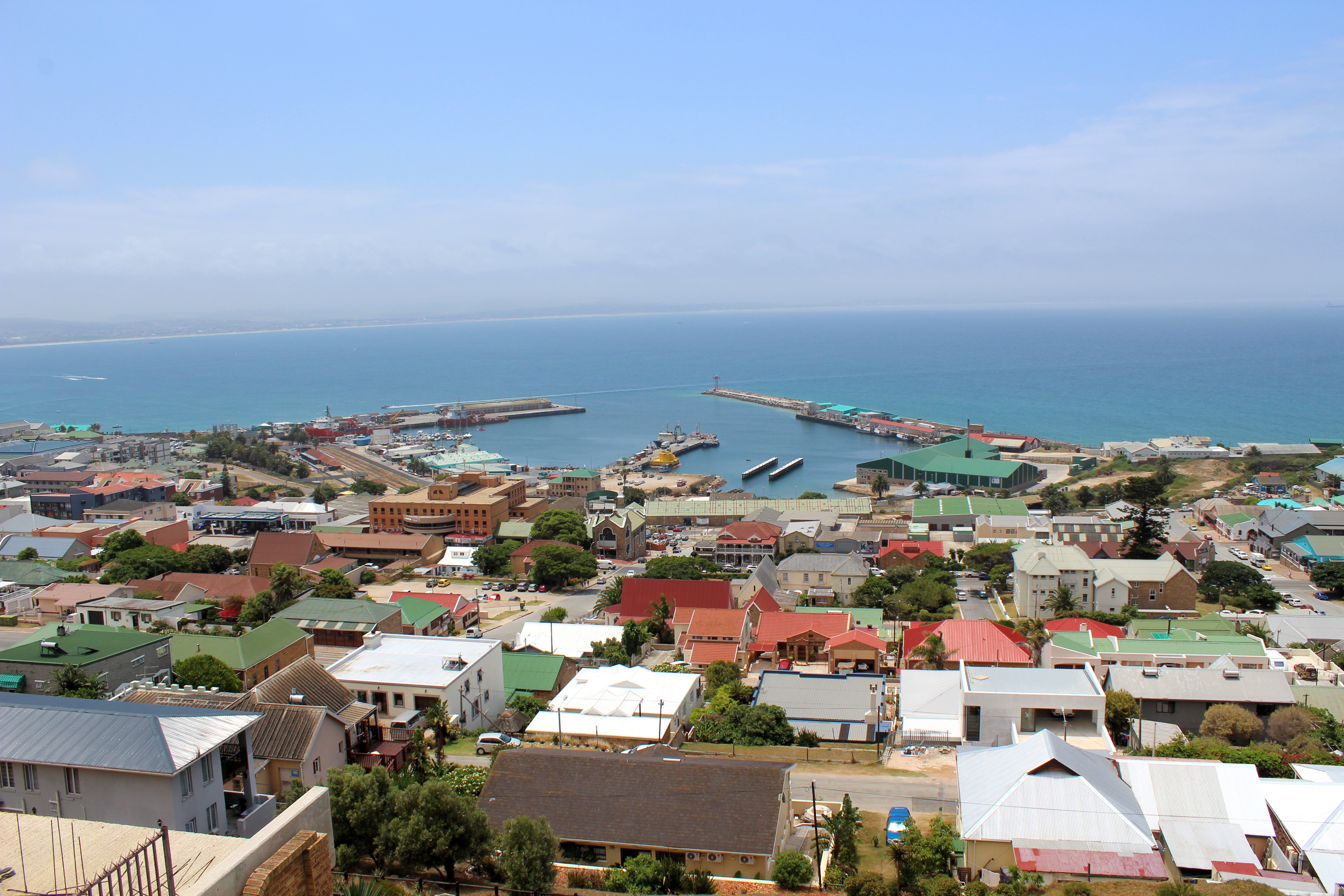
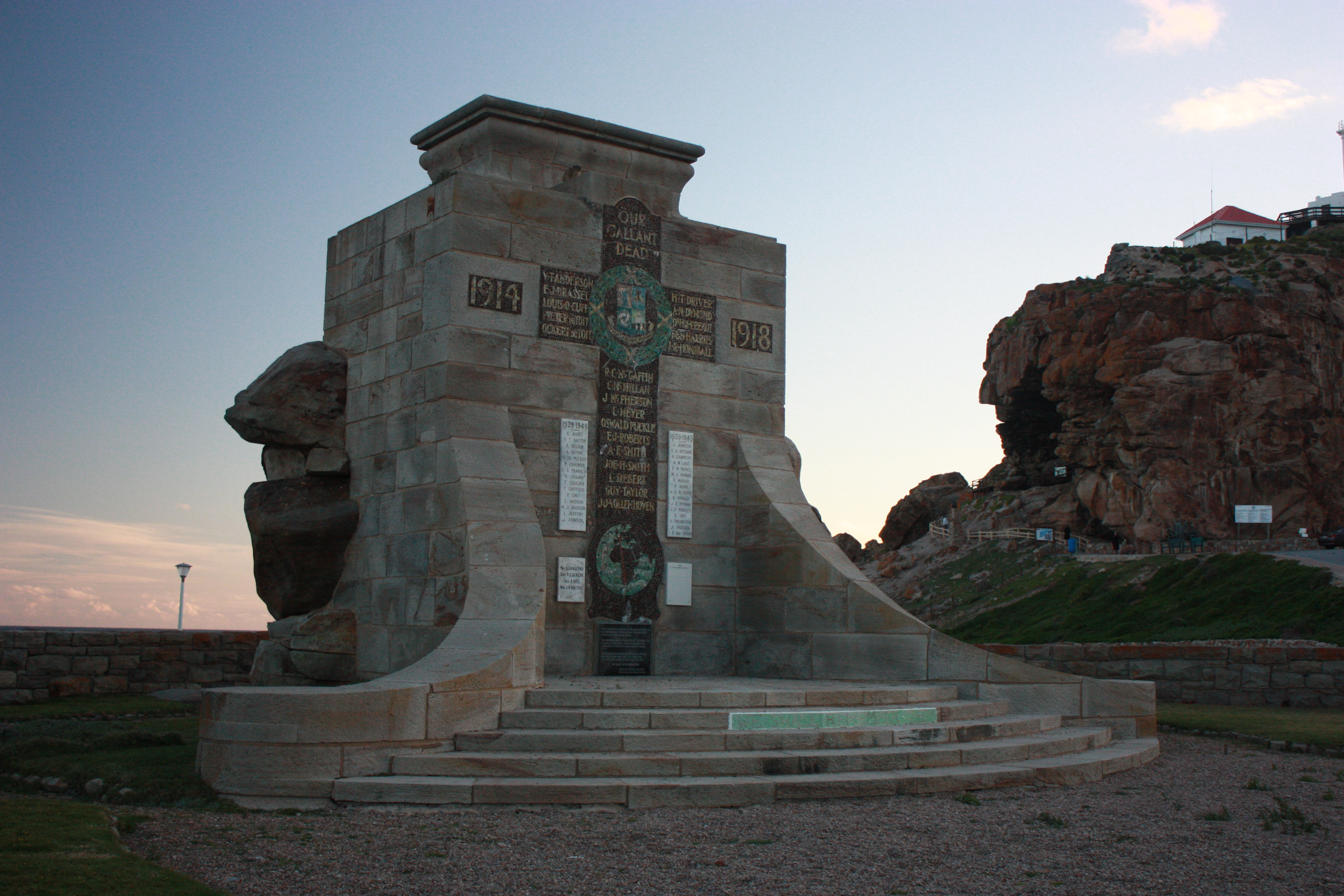
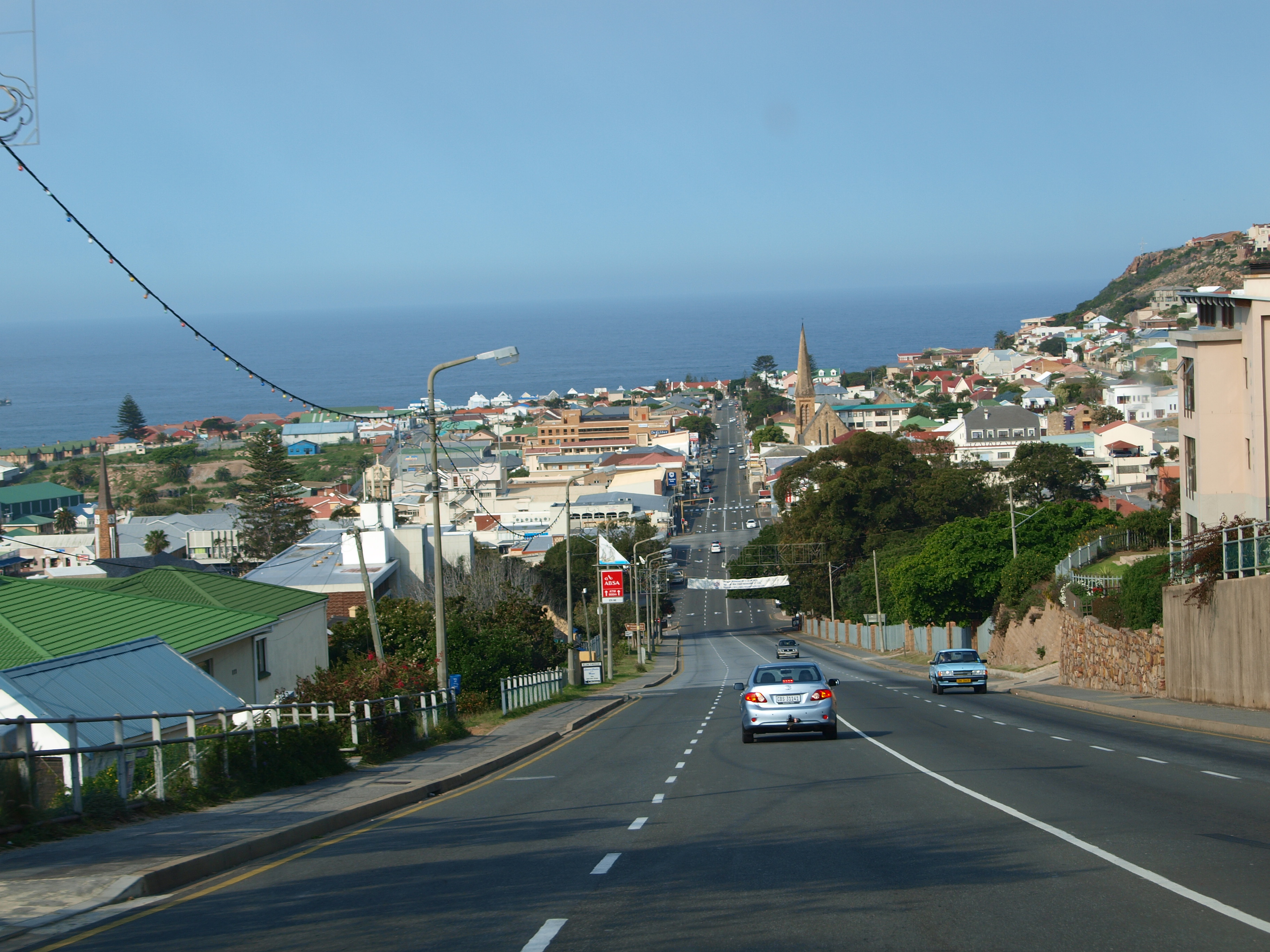
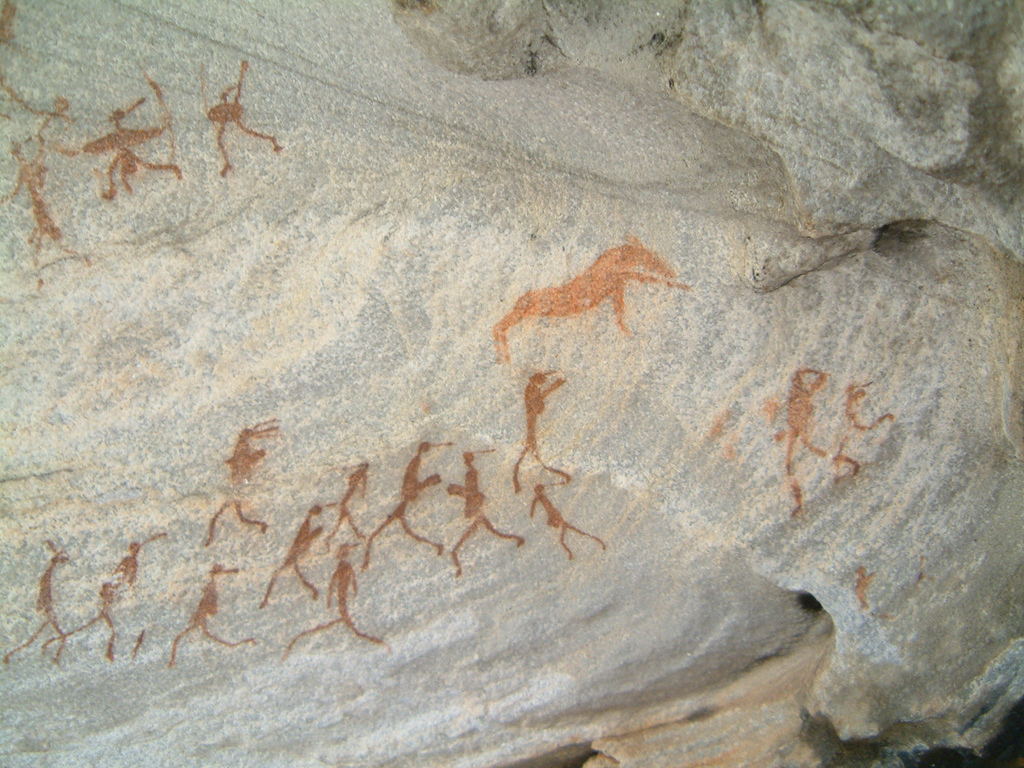
- From top, an aerial view of Mossel Bay. A view of the port at Mossel Bay (centre left). World War I war memorial (centre right). A view down Marsh Street of downtown Mossel Bay (bottom left). San rock art just outside of Mossel bay (bottom right).

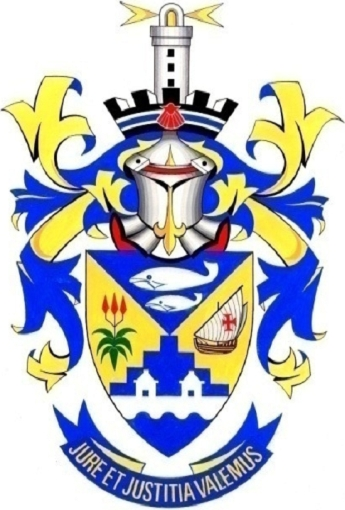
- Coat of arms
- Motto: Jure et Justitia Valemus (Latin: We are strong in law and justice)
- Location within Western Cape Location within South Africa Location within Africa
- Coordinates: 34°11′00″S 22°08′00″E
- Country: South Africa
- Province: Western Cape
- District: Garden Route
- Municipality: Mossel Bay
- Established: 1848

Area
  - Total: 36.8 km^{2} (14.2 sq mi)

Population (2011)
  - Total: 99,000
  - Density: 2,700/km^{2} (7,000/sq mi)

Racial makeup (2011)
  - Black African: 12.7%
  - Coloured: 51.5%
  - Indian/Asian: 0.8%
  - White: 34.3%
  - Other: 0.7%

First languages (2011)
  - Afrikaans: 81.5%
  - English: 9.2%
  - Xhosa: 6.5%
  - Other: 2.8%
- Time zone: UTC+2 (SAST)
- Postal code (street): 6506
- PO box: 6500
- Area code: 044

Mossel Bay (Afrikaans: Mosselbaai) is a harbour town of about 170,000 people on the Garden Route of South Africa. It is an important tourism and farming region of the Western Cape Province. Mossel Bay lies 400 kilometres east of the country's seat of parliament, Cape Town (which is also the capital city of the Western Cape), and 400 km west of Gqeberha, the largest city in the Eastern Cape. The older parts of the town occupy the north-facing side of the Cape St Blaize Peninsula, whilst the newer suburbs straddle the Peninsula and have spread eastwards along the sandy shore of the Bay.

The town's economy relied heavily on farming, fishing and its commercial harbour (the smallest in the Transnet Port Authority's stable of South African commercial harbours), until the 1969 discovery of natural offshore gas fields led to the development of the gas-to-liquids refinery operated by PetroSA. Tourism is another important driver of Mossel Bay's economy.

== Etymology ==
The origin of the name Mossel Bay (the Bay of Mussels) has to do with the ascendancy of the Dutch shipping merchants in the late 16th and the early 17th centuries. In one account, the explorer Cornelis de Houtman named the place Mosselbaai when he stopped there in 1595, whilst in another, the Dutch Admiral Paulus van Caerden named it when he came ashore on 8 July 1601. Whatever the case, though, the mussels and oysters on the shore would have been a welcome addition to the limited diet on which ship's crews were expected to survive in those days.

== History ==
Although best known as the place where the first Europeans landed on South African soil (Bartolomeu Dias and his crew arrived on 3 February 1488), Mossel Bay's human history can – as local archaeological deposits have revealed – be traced back more than 164,000 years.

The modern history of Mossel Bay began in February 1488, when the Portuguese explorer Bartolomeu Dias landed with his men at a point close to the site of the modern-day Dias Museum Complex. Here they found a spring from which to replenish their drinking water supplies. Dias had been appointed by King John II of Portugal to search for a trading route to India and, without realising it, actually rounded the Cape of Good Hope. The expedition then landed at Mossel Bay – which he named Angra dos Vaqueiros (The Bay of Cowherds). Dias is also credited with having given the Cape the name Cabo das Tormentas (the 'Cape of Storms'), although King John II later changed this to Cabo da Boa Esperança (the Cape of Good Hope).

Dias' excursion ashore ended hastily when the local people chased him off in a hail of stones.

By the time the Portuguese explorer Vasco da Gama reached the area in 1497, the Bay had been marked on the maps as Aguada de São Brás, the Watering Place of St Blaize - whose feast is celebrated on 3 February.

Da Gama bartered successfully for cattle with the local Khoi people in what is generally regarded as the first commercial transaction between Europeans and the indigenous people of South Africa.

=== Post Office Tree ===
In 1501, another Portuguese navigator, Pedro d'Ataide, sought shelter in Mossel Bay after losing much of his fleet in a storm. He left an account of the disaster hidden in an old shoe which he suspended from a milkwood tree (Sideroxylon inerme) near the spring from which Dias had drawn his water. The report was found by the explorer to whom it was addressed – João da Nova – and the tree served as a sort of post office for decades thereafter. More recently, a boot-shaped post box has been erected under the now famous Post Office Tree, and letters posted here are franked with a commemorative stamp. This has ensured that the tree has remained one of the town's biggest tourist attractions.

João da Nova erected a small shrine near the Post Office Tree, and although no traces of it remain, it is considered the first place of Christian worship in South Africa.

=== European settlement ===
Although the Dutch governor of the Cape Colony, Jan de la Fontaine, visited Mossel Bay and erected a possession stone here in 1734, the first permanent European building – a fortress-like granary – was built only in 1787. In July of the following year, the first shipment of wheat grown in the area was shipped from the Bay.

Although a British force had invaded the Cape in 1806, and Britain had taken permanent possession of the Colony in 1814, the Mossel Bay area retained its Dutch-given name until its declaration as a magistracy in 1848, when it was renamed Aliwal South, after the Battle of Aliwal in India, where the then governor of the British-held Cape Colony, Harry Smith, had won victory over the Sikhs on 8 January 1846. The name Aliwal South never stuck, however – even when the town was officially proclaimed in 1848, and when it became a Municipality in 1852.

From the earliest days of the Dutch settlers, Mossel Bay acted as the major port serving the Southern Cape region and its hinterland, the arid Klein Karoo (or Little Karoo), and during the ostrich feather boom of the late 19th and early 20th centuries, more than 800 000 kg of feathers were exported through the port every year – which may have been the impetus that led to the construction of the first breakwater in 1912.

Fishing and farming remained the main activities of the area during the early years of the 20th Century, and the growth of the port reflected this. The discovery of natural gas fields offshore in 1969, of the FA gas field in the Bredasdorp Basin (also off the Southern Cape coast) in 1980, and of the nearby EM field in 1983, led to the development of the Mossgas gas-to-liquids refinery, commissioned in 1987 and renamed the PetroSA Refinery in 2002.

This changed the nature of the port so that its major business now comes from serving supply ships for PetroSA's offshore platforms, and from export via its offshore single buoy mooring, which is located in about 21 metres of water in an unsheltered roadstead at Voorbaai, in the lee of the St Blaize Peninsula.

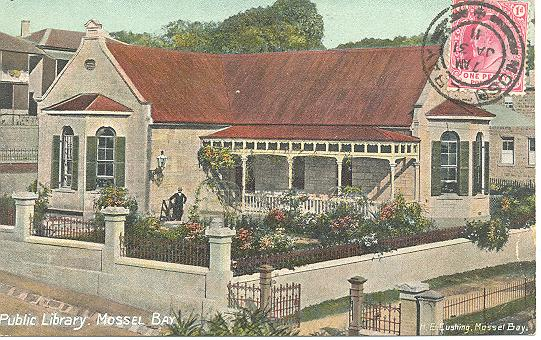
Public Library Mossel Bay (old postcard)

The development of the refinery led to a marked increase in property development in Mossel Bay, with the number of houses growing rapidly to accommodate the workforce during the construction period.

Many of the people who came to work on the project remained in the town after commissioning, and it would appear from the changing economy of the town that they found work in tourism, light industry or commerce.

Whilst the Port and the Refinery have, of course, had a major influence on the development of Mossel Bay, they have always worked in tandem with the growth of tourism and general commerce so that the town now boasts a balanced and vibrant economy. Tourism in particular has influenced much of the growth since 1994, although the town has been a popular resort destination for South Africans since as early as the late 1800s.

The Afrikaans Language and Cultural Society (Afrikaans: Afrikaanse Taal en Kultuurvereniging), also known as the ATKV, bought the farm Hartenbos, east of what was then the town of Mossel Bay, in 1936, and developed it into a holiday resort (now known as the ATKV Hartenbos Resort, and considered the biggest self-catering resort in the Western Cape Province). This was a significant step in the development of the town's tourism economy as it positioned Mossel Bay as a beach holiday destination. Beach tourism remains a major focus for incoming tourism in the 21st century.

South Africa installed its first democratically elected government in 1994, which brought about sweeping changes in the structure of local government throughout the country - one of the results of which was that Mossel Bay merged with the smaller, neighbouring villages of Friemersheim, Great Brak River and Herbertsdale to form the present-day Mossel Bay Local Municipality in December 2000.

== Geography ==
=== Climate ===
Mossel Bay has an ocean-moderated semi-arid climate (Köppen climate classification: BSh).

Mossel Bay's climate is mild throughout the year as the town is situated in the area where the winter rainfall and all-year rainfall regions of the Western Cape Province meet. Its weather is influenced by the Agulhas Current of the Indian Ocean to the south, and by the presence of the Outeniqua Mountains to the north. Mossel Bay receives 80% of its rainfall at night.

Frost is rare or almost absent and snow has never been recorded on the coastal platform. Snow does, however, occasionally fall on the mountain peaks and can be seen from the town on rare occasions. Prevailing winds are westerly in winter (May - August) and easterly in summer (September - April), and rarely reach storm- or gale-force strength. The average days of sunshine are 320 days per year.

Average temperatures
Season	Day time	Night time
Summer (September - April)	26 °C	12 °C
Winter (May - August)	19 °C	8 °C

Climate data for Mossel Bay, South Africa
Month	Jan	Feb	Mar	Apr	May	Jun	Jul	Aug	Sep	Oct	Nov	Dec	Year
Mean daily maximum °C (°F)	23 (73)	23 (73)	22 (71)	21 (69)	19 (67)	19 (66)	18 (64)	17 (63)	17 (63)	18 (65)	20 (68)	22 (71)	20 (68)
Mean daily minimum °C (°F)	19 (67)	19 (67)	18 (65)	17 (62)	15 (59)	13 (56)	13 (55)	12 (54)	13 (56)	14 (58)	16 (61)	18 (65)	16 (60)
Average precipitation mm (inches)	30 (1.2)	33 (1.3)	41 (1.6)	38 (1.5)	38 (1.5)	33 (1.3)	33 (1.3)	36 (1.4)	41 (1.6)	38 (1.5)	36 (1.4)	30 (1.2)	420 (16.5)
Source: Weatherbase

=== Topography ===
Mossel Bay straddles the Cape St Blaize peninsula (which rises to an average height of 96 metres), and spreads out along the sandy shores of the Indian Ocean, eastwards towards the town of George. The Outeniqua Mountains, which form part of the Cape Fold Belt, lie to the north of the municipal area. These mountains of sandstone and shale are characterised by gentle slopes to the seaward side (which are generally covered by montane fynbos and grasslands), and rise to a height of 1,578 metres at Cradock Peak, near George (40 km east of Mossel Bay), and 1,675 metres at Formosa Peak near Plettenberg Bay (150 km east of Mossel Bay).

To the east, the land slopes upwards towards the wave-cut platform (average elevation 245 metres) that characterises the more lush all-year-round rainfall area of the Garden Route. Here the land is mostly covered by grass and farmlands. The deep sandy soils of the western portion of the municipal area also give way to grass and farm-lands, with large stands of typically dry fynbos which are characterised by, amongst others, the Aloe ferox (also known as the bitter aloe, Cape aloe or red aloe) from which skin-care products are made locally, and the Chondropetalum tectorum (Cape or thatching reed) which is used for the roofing of traditional Cape-Dutch buildings.

The municipal area's boundaries are the Gouritz River in the west, the Outeniqua Mountains to the north, the Maalgate River in the east, and the Indian Ocean to the south.

== Demography ==
According to the South African National Census of 2022, the population of Mossel Bay (including the adjacent townships) is 140,075 people. Of this population, 40.9% described themselves as "Coloured", 40.1% as "Black African" and 17.6% as "White". 57.4% spoke Afrikaans as their first language, 30.7% spoke Xhosa and 6.9% spoke English.

In the 1936 Census the town had a total population of 7,227 people making it the 39th largest settlement in South Africa; 3,782 of whom were recorded as "Coloured," 3,260 as "European," 93 as "Asiatic," and 92 of whom were recorded as "Native" or "Bantu".

== Attractions ==
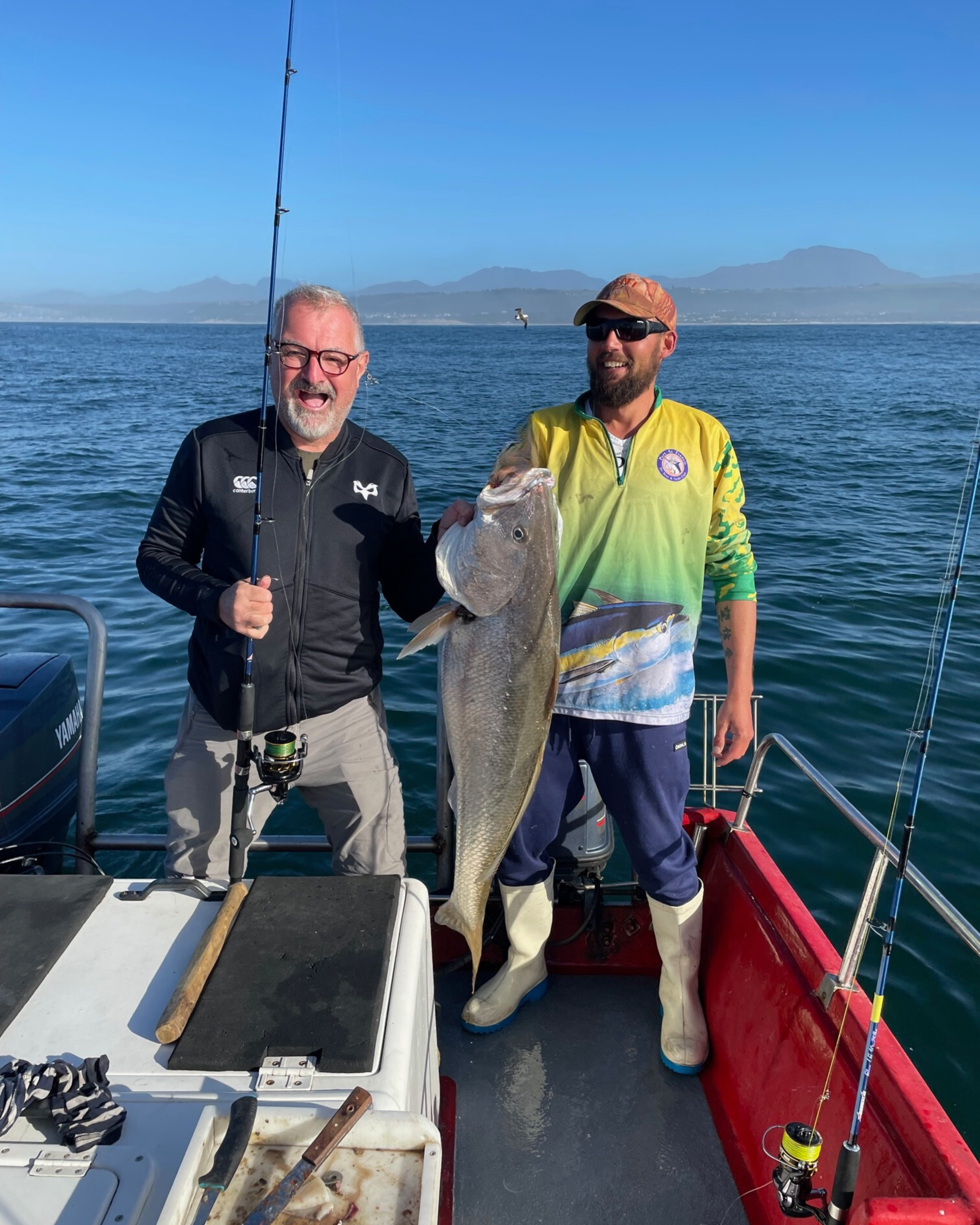
Dusky kob caught during a fishing charter in Mossel Bay

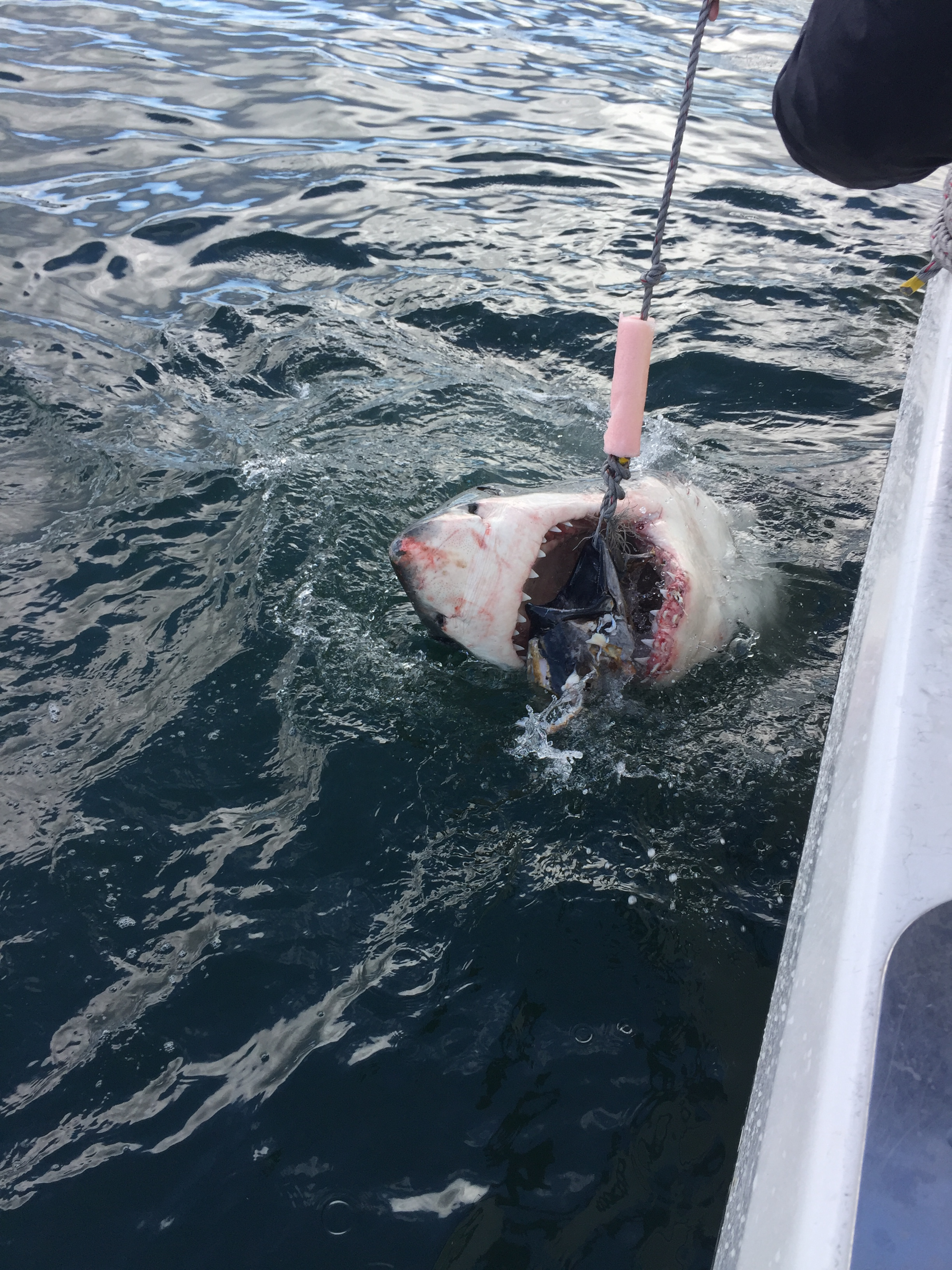
Great white shark, Mossel Bay

Mossel Bay has been a beach holiday destination for South Africans for more than a century – a situation that received a particular boost after the Afrikaanse Taal en Kultuur Vereniging (ATKV) bought the farm Hartenbos in the 1930s, and began developing it as a holiday resort for its members.

The major attractions were then, and (to a large extent) still are, the dry, warm and stable weather, and the Indian Ocean and its beaches. However, with good roads, modern vehicles and the development of inland accommodation, the broader environment of the area (including the Outeniqua Mountains to the north, and large stands of fynbos, or Cape macchia, to the west) is now vital to the tourism economy.

The town is a major attraction for adventure tourism, and offers deep sea fishing, SCUBA diving, white shark cage diving, whale watching, sky diving, and the longest over the ocean zipline.

In addition, the history of the town (Mossel Bay was the site of the first contact between European explorers and indigenous people), and its cultural attractions are important features.

Mossel Bay is situated exactly halfway between Cape Town (and the Cape Winelands) and Port Elizabeth (with its game reserves), and is therefore a popular stopping-off and resting point on the itineraries of international visitors to the Western and Eastern Cape Provinces.

The Bartolomeu Dias Museum Complex is the largest of the museums in Mossel Bay. Originally designed to celebrate the arrival of Bartolomeu Dias and his crew on 3 February 1488, and to protect the "Post Office Tree", the Complex now offers a wider look at the history of Mossel Bay from environmental, archaeological, and cultural perspectives. A Kramat said to be of "Sheikh Sayed Abdurahmaan Al-Mujahidin" also lies in the Museum Complex

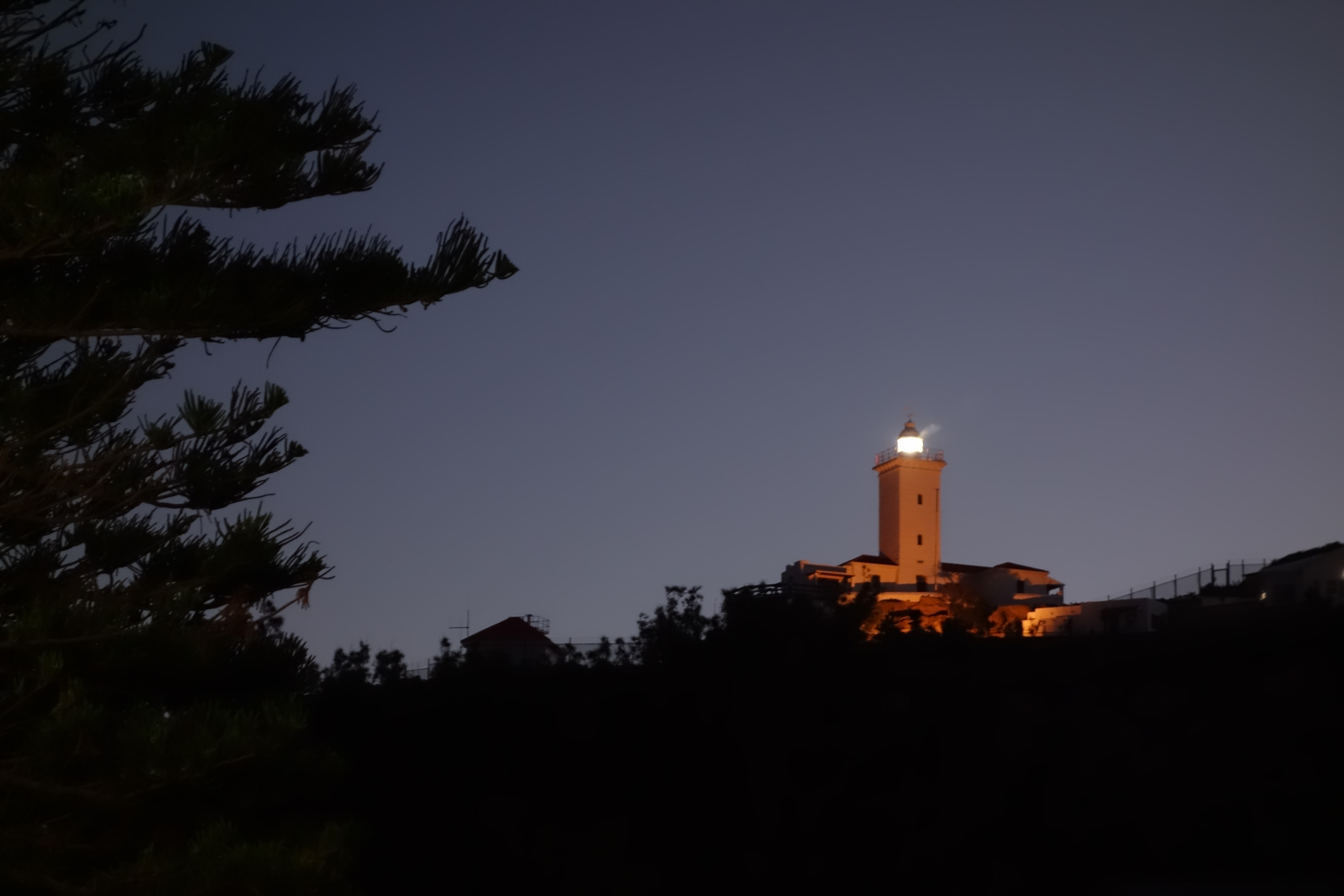
Cape St Blaize lighthouse, Mossel Bay – South Africa

Cape St. Blaize Lighthouse (34.186028°S 22.156152°E) was built in 1864 to designs by the Colonial engineer, R. Robinson. The original light (on a masonry tower 20.5 metres in height) was stationary, but in 1897 a revolving, clock-work light, which required winding every three hours, was fitted. This was used until the late 1970s. The light is now fully automated.

== Economy ==
=== Tourism ===
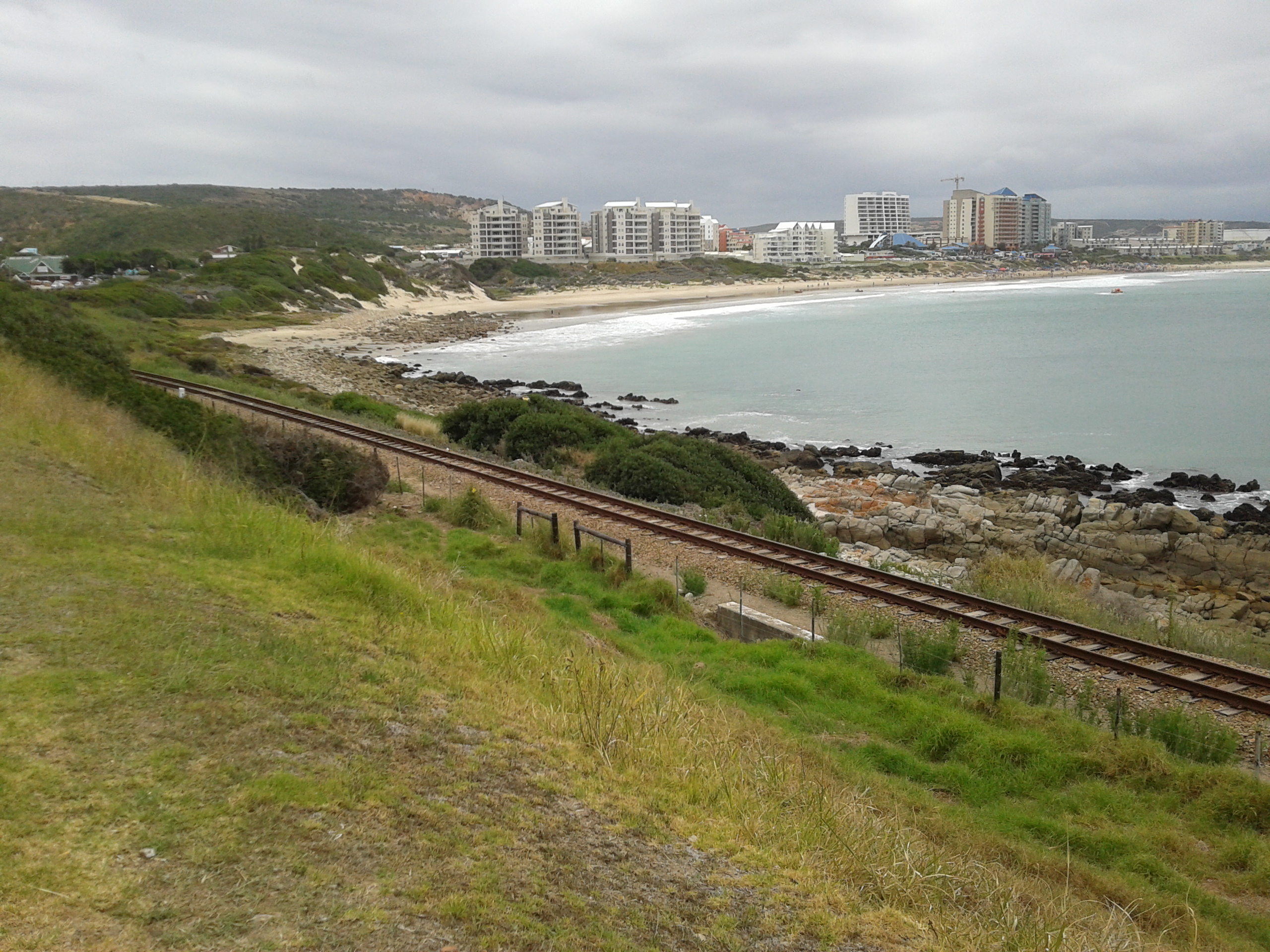
Diaz Beach, Mossel Bay

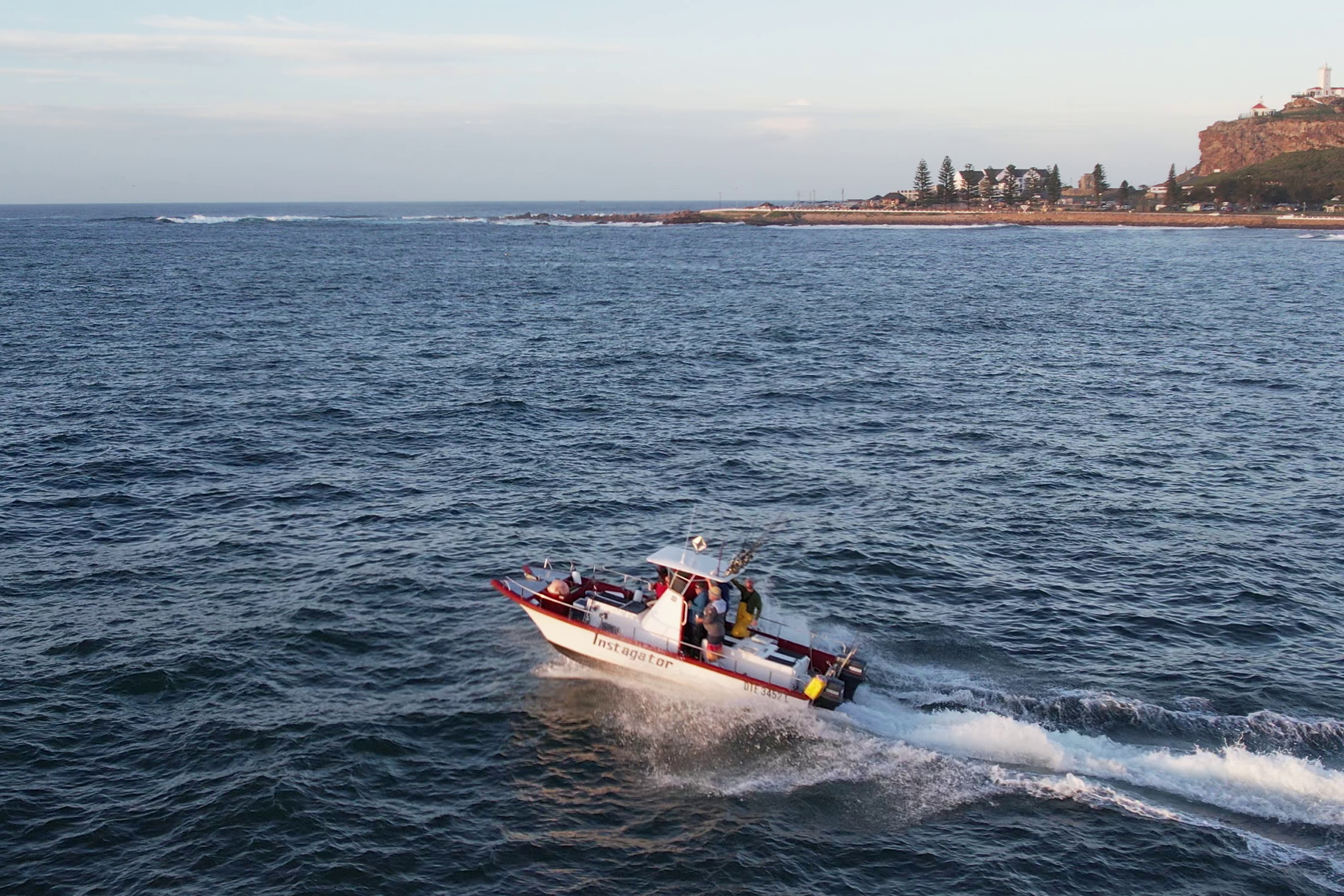
Fishing boat off The Point, Mossel Bay

Mossel Bay has a strong tourism economy. The summer holiday season (from about mid-December to mid-January) is the busiest time of the year, and, in December 2010, the Municipality estimated that the town provided accommodation for between 50,000 and 60,000 holidaymakers per night during this period.

=== Natural gas and oil ===
The PetroSA (Petroleum, Oil and Gas Corporation of South Africa Pty Limited) Refinery – which was commissioned as Mossgas in 1987 – is situated about 13 km to the west of the town's central business district. It produces 36,000 barrels (5,700 m^{3}) per day (bbl/d) – a crude oil equivalent of 45,000 bbl/d (7,200 m^{3}/d) – using the Fischer–Tropsch process of converting natural gas (which is piped from offshore fields via PetroSA's FA Platform).

Mossel Bay's GTL plant serves up to 15 percent of South Africa's transport fuels requirements. It produces unleaded gasoline, ultra low sulphur diesel, kerosene, low aromatic distillates, drilling fluids, liquid petroleum gas, low sulphur fuel oil, anhydrous alcohols, liquid oxygen, liquid nitrogen, carbon dioxide, and waxes.

== Transport ==
=== Road transport ===
Mossel Bay straddles the N2 national highway, which is South Africa's main coastal road from Cape Town in the Western Cape Province, to Durban in KwaZulu-Natal Province. (Using this route, Mossel Bay lies exactly at the midpoint between Cape Town and the Eastern Cape Province's capital of Port Elizabeth – 400 km each way).

The Municipality of Mossel Bay maintains 417,9 km of paved and concreted roads, and 24 km of gravel roads. Mossel Bay is a stopping point for all major road transport operators licensed for this region.

=== Harbour ===
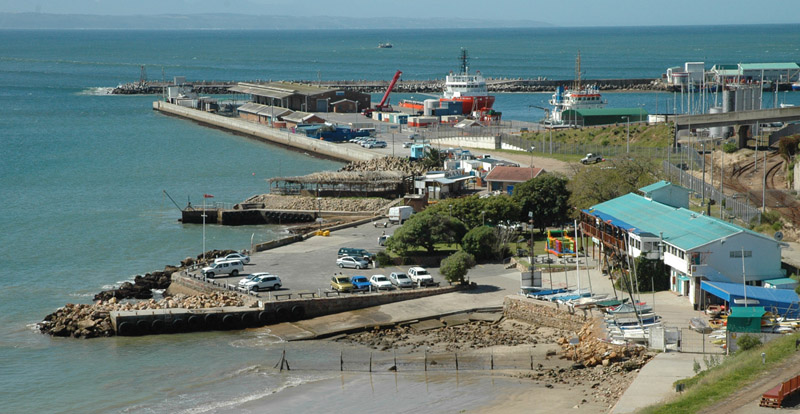
View of Harbour and Yacht Club

The Port of Mossel Bay (34.180047°S 22.146034°E) is the smallest commercial harbour on the South African coast. It caters mostly for the oil industry (off-shore gas was discovered in late 1980s), and for a small fishing fleet, and is owned and managed by the Transnet National Ports Authority, which falls directly under South Africa's Department of Public Enterprises.

The depth of the entrance channel is 8 metres, while the maximum permissible draught inside the harbour is 6.5 metres. Pilotage is compulsory from a point 2 nautical miles (3.7 km) northeast of Cape St Blaize.

Bunkering is available on the jetty and at quays 2, 3, and 5. Quay 4 can accommodate vessels of up to 130 metres, with a draught of 6.5 metres. A ship repair slipway can accommodate vessels of up to 200 tonnes. Ship chandler and stevedore services are available, as are diving services for hull cleaning, underwater inspection, salvage, etc.

The harbour has two offshore mooring buoys inside port limits: a catenary buoy mooring that caters for ships of up to 32,000 DWT (maximum length 204 metres, draught 12 metres); and a single point mooring (SPM) marine tanker terminal that's connected to three hoses for the export of products from PetroSA's gas-to-fuel refinery, which is situated inland (about 13 km) and directly west of Mossel Bay. The SPM is located off Voorbaai in an open, unsheltered roadstead in about 21 metres of water.

During the 2008/09 financial year Mossel Bay served 1,567 vessels (mostly South African trawlers) with a combined gross tonnage of 3,317,364 gt, and handled a total of 2,014,185 tonnes of cargo (1,940,310 t of bulk cargo – mostly oil products – and 73,875 t of break-bulk). 773,267 tonnes of cargo was landed, and 1,240,918 tonnes was shipped.

15000 people from all over the world worked on the synthol & refinery plant in Mossel Bay from 1998 to 2002.

=== Rail ===
Mossel Bay is connected to the national rail network via a branch line to George. The line celebrated its centenary on 25 September 2007.

== Archaeology ==
=== Pinnacle Point Caves ===
According to the presently accepted theory of the Recent African Origin of Modern Humans, all people alive today evolved from a core population of about 600 individuals who lived on the African Continent between 100,000 and 200,000 years ago. The Mossel Bay Archaeology Project (MAP) has shown that the Southern Cape Coast was most probably the point where modern behaviour first emerged about 164,000 years ago.

The Mossel Bay Archaeology Project was created to examine the ancient middens in the Pinnacle Point Caves, most of which lie about 12 km east of Cape St Blaize.

The discovery was made during routine archaeological surveys conducted prior to the development of the Pinnacle Point Beach and Golf Resort, and excavations began in the year 2000 under the leadership of Professor Curtis Marean (a palaeoanthropologist with the Institute of Human Origins at the Arizona State University), and by Dr. Peter Nilssen, of the Iziko South African Museum. The scientific team includes researchers from South Africa (the University of Cape Town), Australia (the University of New South Wales and the University of Wollongong), as well as Israel and France. Funding for the project was obtained from the National Science Foundation (USA); the Hyse Family Trust; the Iziko South African Museum; the University of Cape Town; and the Dias Museum in Mossel Bay.

The Project focuses on a series of caves cut into the sea-facing cliffs on the southern boundary of the Pinnacle Point Beach and Golf Resort, which were occupied between 170,000 and 40,000 years ago by Middle Stone Age people.

The excavations have revealed the earliest evidence for the systematic exploitation of marine resources such as shellfish (which would have provided the Omega-3 fatty acids required for the development of the modern human brain); the earliest evidence for the use of dyes in symbolling (particularly the use of ochre, possibly for body painting or decorative arts); the use of advanced bladelet technology (embedding smaller blades into larger strata to create complex tools); and the earliest evidence for the use of heat treatment in the manufacture of stone tools.

The significance of the finds is increased by the presence of fossilised carbon isotopes in the dripstone formations (stalactites) hanging from the roofs of the caves, which contain a record of the composition of the water that seeped into the caves over a period beginning about 400,000 years ago. As part of their work, the scientists on the Bay Archaeology Project are studying this evidence in order to create a portrait of the climate of the area over the period 400,000 to 30,000 years ago so as to be able to correlate the evidence of human behaviour on the floor of the caves with climate patterns, and thus learn how man has adapted to climate change over the ages.

=== Cape St Blaize Cave ===
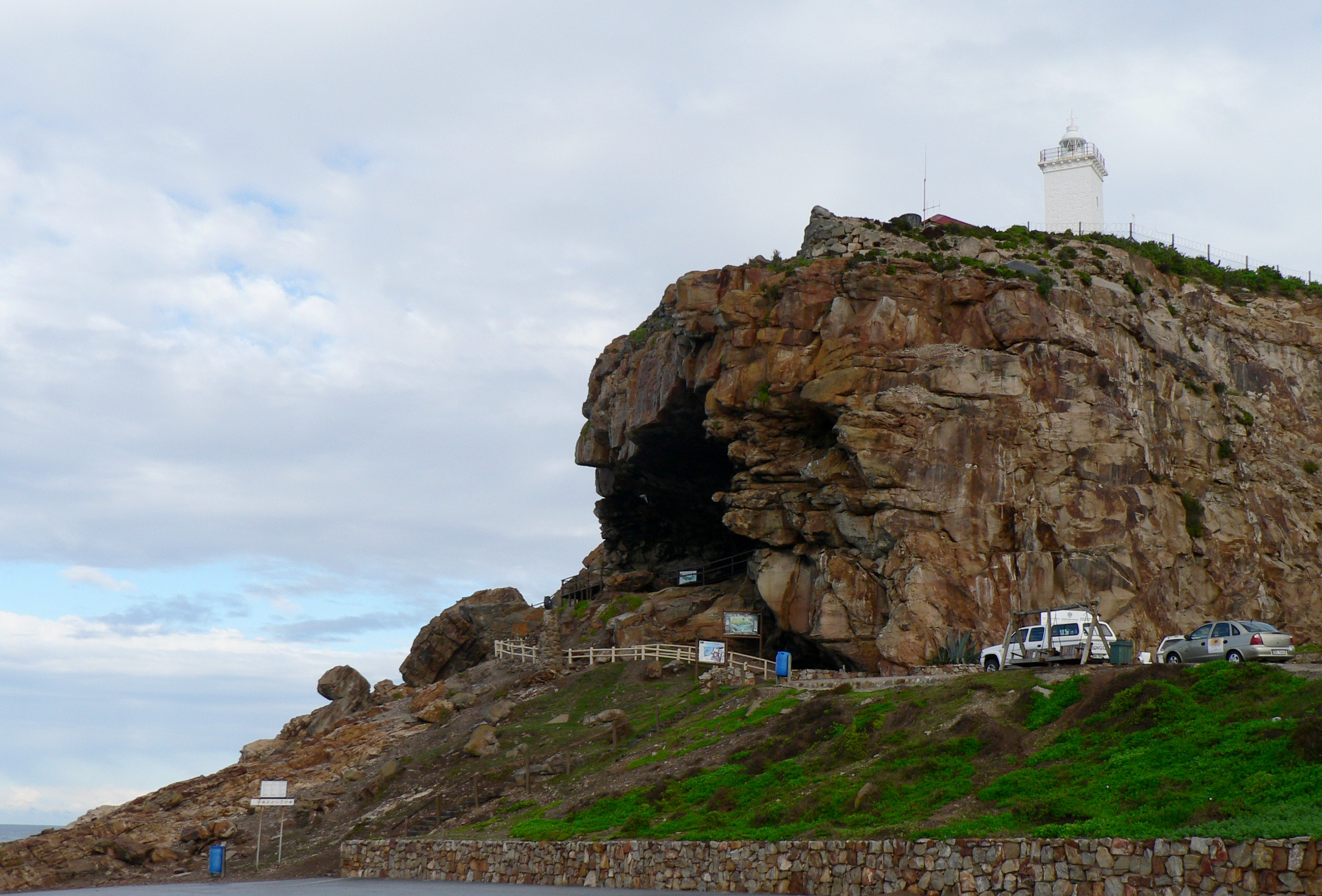
Cape St Blaize Cave

The Cape St Blaize Cave is situated directly under the Cape St. Blaize Lighthouse, is the site of one of South Africa's oldest archaeological excavations. It was first excavated in 1888 by George Leith, then by T. Rupert Jones in 1899, and by A.J.H (John) Goodwin in the 1920s. Goodwin is said to have described the Middle Stone Age Mossel Bay Industry from his findings at Cape St Blaize .

The Cave has revealed deposits dating from about 200,000 years ago to the pre-colonial period, during which time middens were laid down by herders of the San or Khoekhoen people.

It is protected by Heritage Western Cape as a Provincial Heritage Site.

=== Rock Art ===
The mountains to the north of Mossel Bay are an important repository of South African rock art. This art, which is now associated with shamanistic practices (in which the rock itself is thought to have been considered the veil between this world and the spirit world), was created by the San people, and specimens may date back as far as 27,000 years.

The rock art sites surrounding Mossel Bay are generally located on private land, and are therefore only accessible to the public in the company of registered guides, who will ensure that the integrity of the pieces remains intact.

== Coats of arms ==
Municipality (1) – The original arms, designed by W.H. Armstrong & Co (of Cape Town), were assumed on 6 October 1905. The shield was quartered as follows: 1 the figure of Justice on a red background; 2 a golden fleece on a blue background; 3 three interlaced golden fish on a blue background; 4 the figure of Neptune on a sky blue background.

Municipality (2) – In 1992, after the Bureau of Heraldry had refused to register the existing arms, because they were heraldically defective, the council accepted a new design, prepared by the Bureau. The new arms were registered at the Bureau on 6 March 1992: Per saltire Argent and Azure, in chief a balance resting on the point of a sword erect, Azure; dexter three fish interlaced in annulet Or, sinister a golden fleece and in base, on a base wavy Azure charged with a bar wavy Argent, a Portuguese caravel, sails set, proper. In layman's terms : the shield was divided in four by two diagonal lines, the upper section displaying a blue balance and a sword on a silver background, the left section three interlaced golden fish on a blue background, the right section a golden fleece on a blue background, and at the bottom a Portuguese caravel on a stylised blue and white sea.

The crest was a lighthouse, and the motto Jure et justitia valemus.

Municipality (3) – A new coat of arms was registered at the Bureau on 20 February 1998: Per saltire, in base grady, Azure and Or, in chief two whales naiant in pale and in base a fess nowy of two Karoo gable houses, Argent, the doors Azure, the lower edge wavy; dexter an aloe Vert flowered Gules and sinister a 15th century Portuguese caravelle proper, the sail charged with a cross paty, Gules. In layman's terms : the shield is divided in four by two diagonal lines, the lower parts of which are stepped, the upper section displaying two silver whales on a blue background, the left section an aloe plant on a golden background, the right section a Portuguese caravel on a golden background, and the bottom section two stylised Karoo gable houses in silver against a blue background.

The crest is a lighthouse issuing from a black mural crown. The motto is, again, Jure et justitia valemus.

== Notable residents ==
- Charles Vintcent (1866 – 1943), cricketer, born in Mossel Bay.
- Robert James Hudson (1885 – 1963), British soldier and twice acting governor of Southern Rhodesia, born in Mossel Bay.
- Eric Robinson (1891 – 1982), veterinarian, grew up in Mossel Bay.
- Andrew Beauchamp-Proctor (1894-1921), World War I airman and Victoria Cross recipient, born in Mossel Bay.
- Pauline Kies (1918 - 1999), botanical illustrator and botanist, lived her last years in Mossel Bay.
- Harry Bromfield (1932 – 2020), cricketer, born in Mossel Bay
- Andries Petrus Putter (1935 – 2014), South African naval admiral, retired to Mossel Bay
- Dalene Matthee (1938 – 2005), novelist, died in Mossel Bay.
- Timothy George Hawarden (1943 – 2009), astrophysicist, born in Mossel Bay
- Riaan Cruywagen (1945), news anchor retired to Mossel Bay.
- Karen Muir (1952 – 2013), competitive swimmer.
- Okkie Terblanche (1952), politician and police general, resides in Mossel Bay
- Louis Jonker (1962), biblical scholar, went to high school in Mossel Bay
- Theo Oosthuizen (1964), rugby union player, born in Mossel Bay
- Fiona Ayerst (1965), wildlife photographer, lives in Mossel Bay
- Henriette Moller (1972), Olympic judoka, born in Mossel Bay
- Jonathan October (1974), cricketer, born in Mossel Bay
- Stefan Terblanche (1975), rugby union player, born in Mossel Bay
- Ryan Johnson (1977), marine scientist, lives in Mossel Bay
- Johann Muller (1980), rugby union player, born in Mossel Bay
- Louis Oosthuizen (1982), golfer, born in Mossel Bay
- Boetie Britz (1987), rugby union player, born in Mossel Bay
- Aldrich Potgieter (2004), professional golfer, raised in Mossel Bay.
