= Cape St. Blaize Lighthouse =

Lighthouse in South Africa

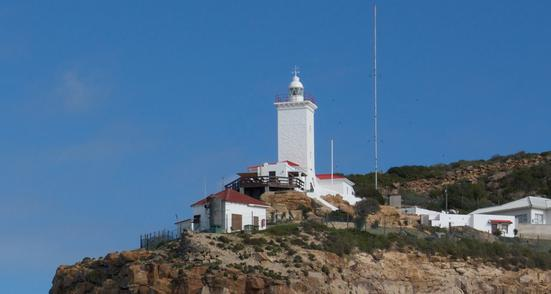
- Location: Mossel Bay; Western Cape; South Africa
- Coordinates: 34°11′09.7″S 22°09′22.9″E

Tower
- Constructed: 1864
- Construction: brick
- Height: 14 metres (46 ft)
- Shape: square tower with balcony and lantern
- Markings: white tower and lantern
- Power source: mains electricity
- Fog signal: "F"

Light
- First lit: 15 March 1864
- Focal height: 73 metres (240 ft)
- Range: 25 nmi (46 km; 29 mi)
- Characteristic: Q (2) W 15s.

Cape St. Blaize Lighthouse is a lighthouse near Mossel Bay, South Africa.

== Images ==
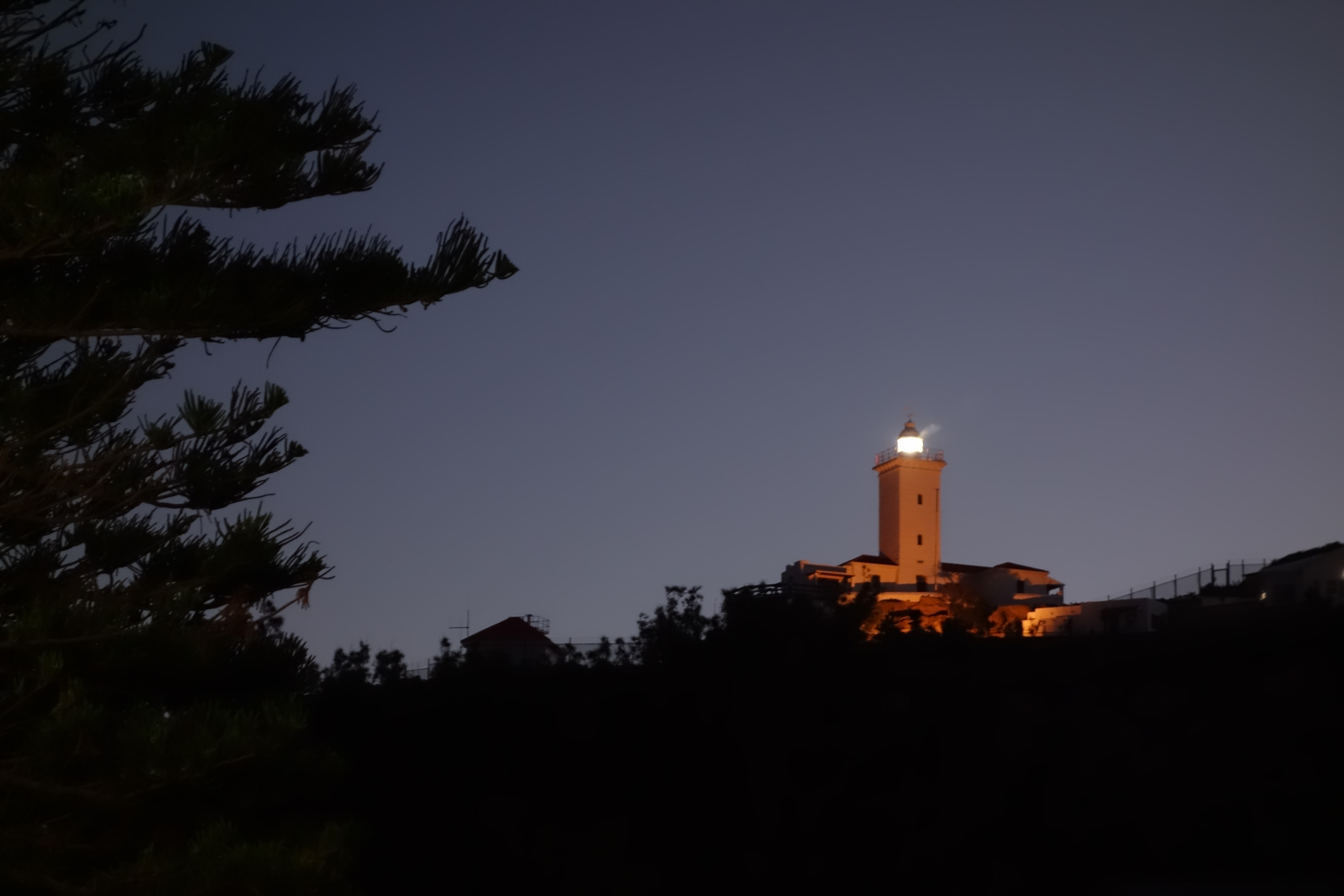
Cape St. Blaize lighthouse at dusk

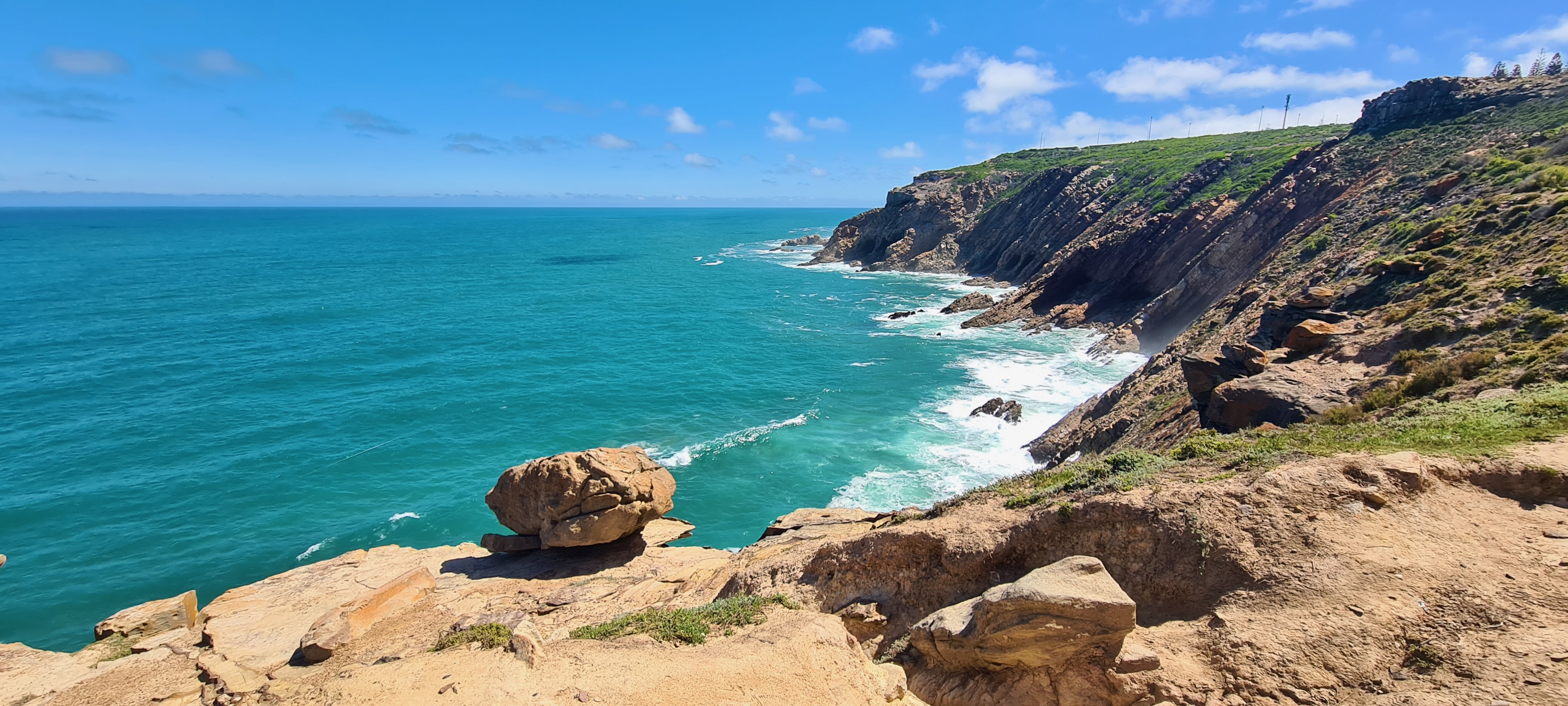
Cliffs below the Cape St. Blaize Lighthouse

== See also ==
- List of lighthouses in South Africa
