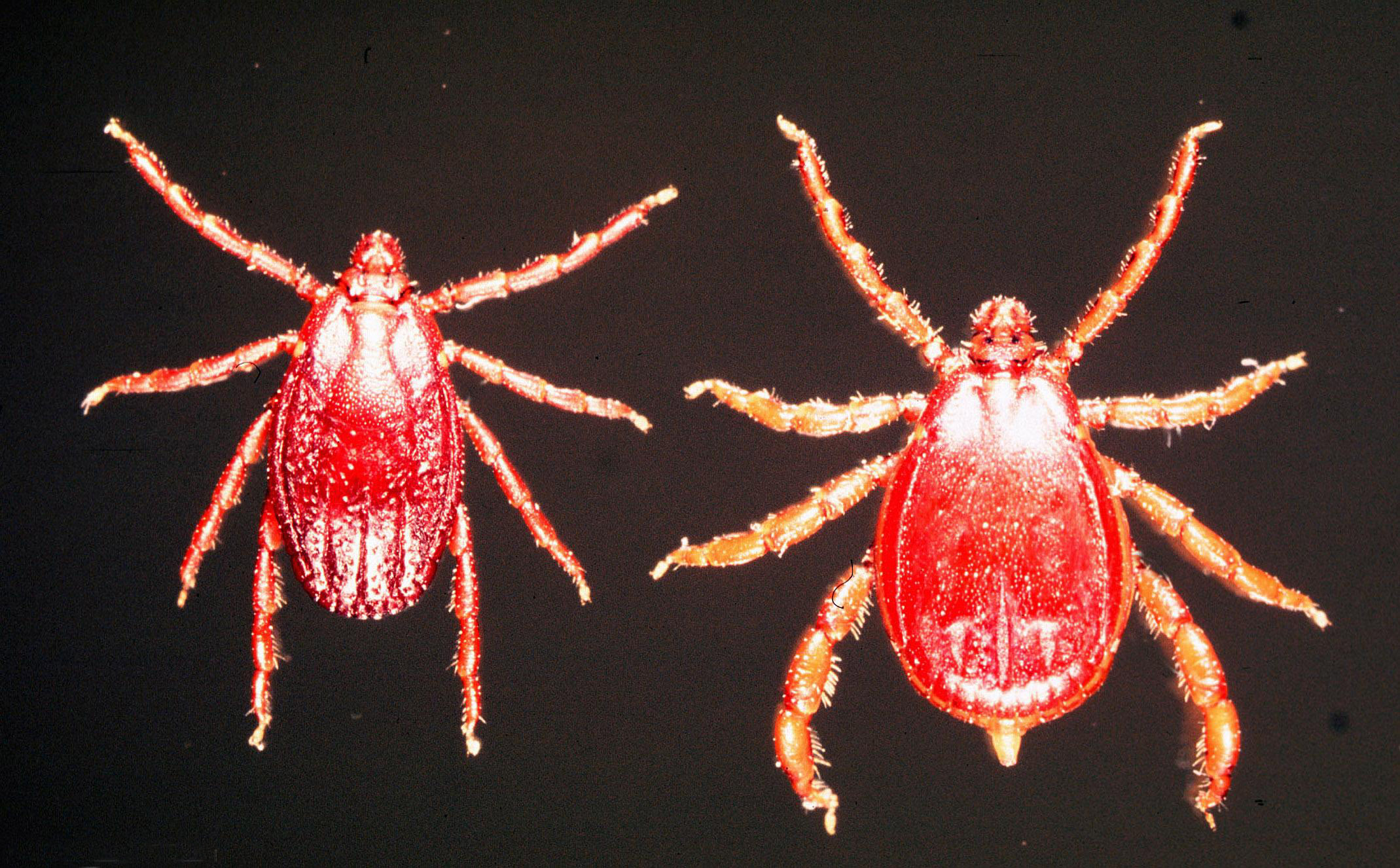
- Female (left) and male (right)
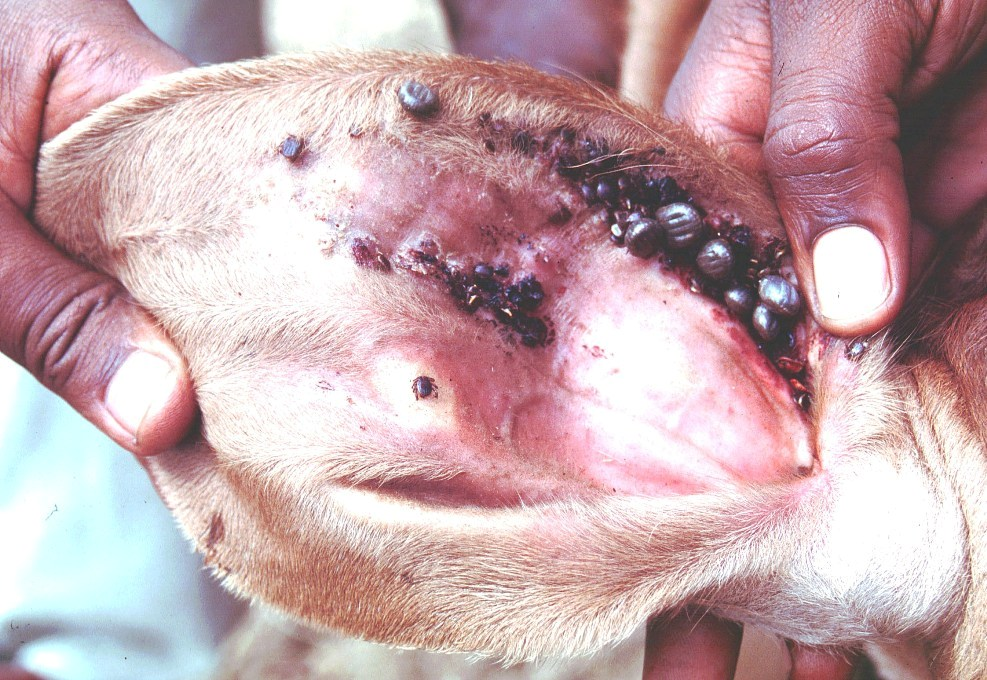
- R. appendiculatus in the ear of a calf

Scientific classification
- Domain: Eukaryota
- Kingdom: Animalia
- Phylum: Arthropoda
- Subphylum: Chelicerata
- Class: Arachnida
- Order: Ixodida
- Family: Ixodidae
- Genus: Rhipicephalus
- Species: R. appendiculatus

Binomial name
- Rhipicephalus appendiculatus Neumann, 1901

= Rhipicephalus appendiculatus =

Species of tick

Rhipicephalus appendiculatus, the brown ear tick, is a hard tick found in Africa where it spreads the parasite Theileria parva, the cause of East Coast fever in cattle. The tick has a three-host life-cycle, spending around 10% of its life feeding on animals. The most common host species include buffalo, cattle, and large antelope, but R. appendiculatus is also found on other animals, such as hares, dogs, and warthogs.

Rhipicephalus appendiculatus is found in the center, east and south-east of Africa, in areas with at least 24 in (610 mm) of rainfall each year.

R. appendiculatus is 1.8 to 4.4 mm (0.071 to 0.173 in) long, and is a dark reddish-brown or brown color.

The sex pheromone used by female ticks to attract males for mating consists of two chemicals; phenol and p-cresol.

R. appendiculatus produces an activator of calcium activated potassium channels, the function of which is unclear. It has been hypothesized that it may enhance the blood flow at the feeding site.
