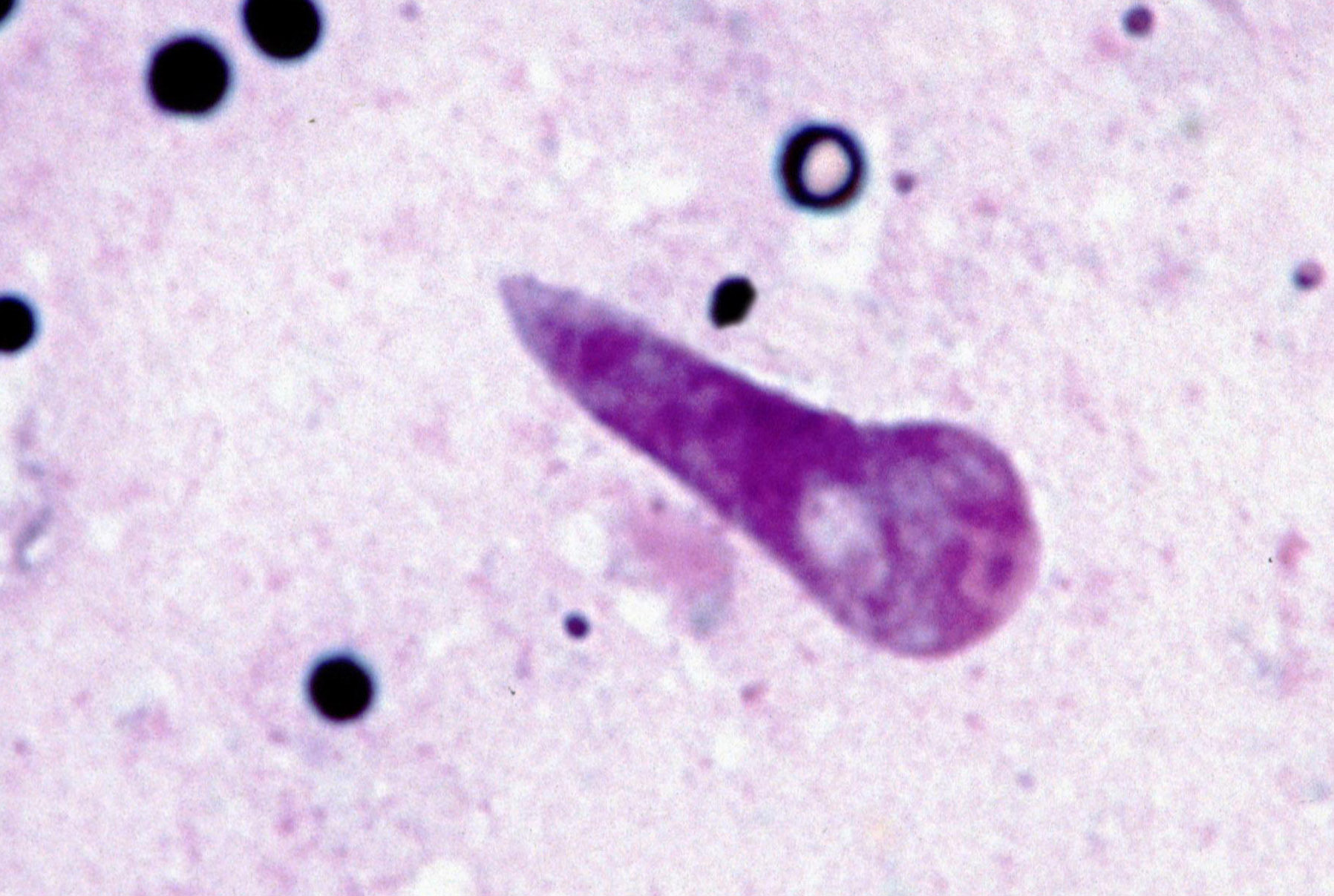
- Kinete stage of Theileria parva in the transmitting tick Rhipicephalus appendiculatus

Scientific classification
- Domain: Eukaryota
- Clade: Sar
- Clade: Alveolata
- Phylum: Apicomplexa
- Class: Aconoidasida
- Order: Piroplasmida
- Family: Theileriidae
- Genus: Theileria
- Species: T. parva

Binomial name
- Theileria parva (Theiler, 1904) Bettencourt, Franca & Borges, 1907

= Theileria parva =

Species of single-celled organism

Theileria parva is a species of parasites, named in honour of Arnold Theiler, that causes East Coast fever (theileriosis) in cattle, a costly disease in Africa. The main vector for T. parva is the tick Rhipicephalus appendiculatus. Theiler found that East Coast fever was not the same as redwater, but caused by a different protozoan.

== Life cycle ==
Sporozoites from the tick secrete into the feeding site of the animal. Sporozoites enter lymphoblasts to form a schizont. There is a clonal expansion of schizonts and then multiply by merging to form merozoites. The merozoites go into erythrocytes and invade the cells and are now in the piroplasm stage. When a tick ingests the piroplasms, the parasites undergo syngamy in the gut and can move to hemolymph. The motile kinetes can infect the salivary glands. From this, sporogony occurs to create sporozoites to continue the life cycle.

=== In definitive host ===
In the cattle host T. parva is an intracellular parasite. Hullinger et al. 1964, von Schubert et al. 2010 and Woods et al. 2013 find the parasite to place itself close to the spindle apparatus during mitosis. This position allows it to follow the spindle through into the next generation of cells.

== Genetics ==
The genome was sequenced by Gardner et al. 2005, finding just over 4,000 resulting proteins. Analysis performed by Bishop et al. 2005 shows at least 2/3 of those are expressed during or prior to schizont. Bishop also contains a cell study using T. parva-specific immune cells to identify antigens.

== Signs and symptoms ==
Theileria parva causes East Coast fever which results from infected lymphocytes. East Coast fever has symptoms of anorexia, fever, enlarged lymph nodes which can cause lymphadenopathy. Less common symptoms include diarrhea and nasal discharge. A disorder called "turning sickness" can occur and is when the parasites in cells block the blood vessels in the brain and causes brain damage. This disease usually results in death but is very uncommon.

== Diagnosis ==
Xenodiagnosis can be used to confirm the tick vectors but is not used routinely. Blood smears can be performed to detect Theileria but can be hard to differentiate from other species. Serological assays, including indirect fluorescent antibody test, IFAT, and enzyme-linked immunosorbent assays, ELISA, are being used in research. For IFAT test, schizont or piroplasms are used from infected animals to identify transforming parasites. This method is economically friendly but is hard to differentiate between Theileria parva and other close species. ELISA is able to detect more specific antigens. Molecular assays such as PCR are continuing on the rise to be used but require more specialized equipment.

== Treatment and control ==
Parvaquone and buparvaquone are used for the early stages of the disease and are very effective. As the disease progress, treatment is much harder to control and parvaquone and buparvaquone are less effective. Immunization for Theileria parva is available and consist of strains of Theileria from infected ticks with oxytetracycline, a type of antibiotic. This inhibits the parasite to develop. It is recommended to immunize cattle approximately 3–4 weeks before turning cattle out on to infected pasture.

== Genomics ==
Theileria parva has four chromosomes and a plastome. In 2005 the sequencing of its genome was announced. T. parva has genes that allow it to attach to white blood cell (leukocyte) membranes, enter the cells and take them over. It then activates the host cells' mitotic pathway, and multiplies along with the host cells. When the genome of Babesia bovis, another protozoan parasite that infects red blood cells (erythrocytes) and causes Babesiosis (Redwater) in cattle, was sequenced in 2007 their genomes were found to be remarkably similar.

== Future outlook ==
Research is being done to create a more effective vaccine for Theileria parva. Approximately 70% of cattle provided with the immunization were protected in a laboratory study. Research is being done to create a vaccine with a mixture of many antigens from sporozoite and schizont stage to increase immunity.
