= Fiona Ayerst =

South African photographer

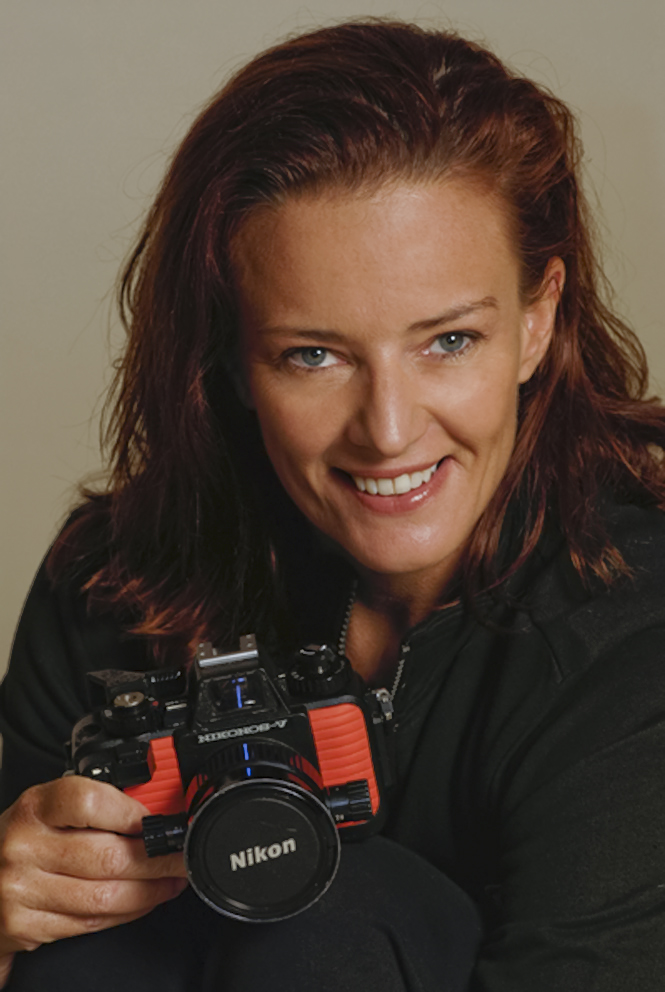
- Fiona Ayerst Johnson with camera
- Born: 20 September 1965 (age 61)
- Education: National College of Photography, Johannesburg; University of KwaZulu-Natal
- Occupations: Underwater photographer, Shark conservation
- Partner: Ryan Johnson
- Children: 1
- Awards: Winescape award (2007); Gold medals, Canola Festival 2012; Top prize, Underwater Photography magazine Wildlife Photographer of the Year (2003); Mossel Bay award

Fiona Ayerst (born 20 September 1965) is a wildlife photographer based in South Africa notable for underwater photography.

== Biography ==
She has swum with many species of shark, photographed them, including the macropredator tiger shark and the massive but tamer whale shark. Her images have won awards in numerous photo competitions. She writes for several magazines, and works as an editor for Beyond Blue magazine. She is a proponent of protecting sharks and ocean environments. Her images have appeared in magazines and newspapers worldwide, such as Time magazine, as well as on magazine covers and coffee table books featuring wildlife photography. She won South Africa's 2003 Wildlife Photographer of the Year. She gave a TED talk in 2012 titled My journey into water. She is a director of Africa Media.
