= Ryan Johnson (marine scientist) =

New Zealand marine scientist (born 1977)

- Born: January 30, 1977 (age 49); Tauranga, N.Z.
- Education: University of Pretoria
- Occupations: Marine Biologist, Television host
- Spouse: Fiona Ayerst
- Children: 1
- Website: Ryan Johnson homepage

Ryan Johnson (30 January 1977) is a marine biologist specializing in researching sharks. He is best known for the shark documentaries that he features in and hosts.

== Early life ==
Johnson grew up in the coastal town of Mount Manganui, New Zealand. As an avid sailor, rower and snorkeler, his passion for the oceans was established early.

Growing up his other passion was Rugby where he gained his provincial age group colours and represented Tauranga Boys' College's 1st IV in 1993 & 1994 as a flanker.

== South Africa ==
In 1998 he moved to South Africa to pursue a scientific career researching the great white shark. At the University of Pretoria he conducted his honours, masters and doctoral theses. During this time he spent a year living on Dyer Island where he began his research into the great white shark's life history. In 2007, he co-founded Oceans Research with three colleagues. In 2011 he helped expose the illegal catching of a shark, an action which caused great controversy. Johnson has tagged great white sharks for research purposes.

== Personal life ==
Johnson lives in Mossel Bay, South Africa with his partner Fiona Ayerst and son Finn Johnson where he conducts research as a Scientist in Residence at Oceans Research, while also directing the work of other divisions of the Oceans such as multimedia design company Oceans Interactive and great white shark inspired clothing range Carcharias.

He's a distant cousin of American film director Rian Johnson.

== Research highlights ==
Johnson was part of the first South African team to successfully attach a satellite transmitters to a great white shark on 24 July 2001. Johnson has tagged great white sharks for research purposes. His major scientific discoveries have been the satellite tracking of Nicole (a 3.6 m great white shark) on a return migration from South Africa to Australia and back, and documenting the great white shark hunting Cape fur seal at night time, a previously unknown behavior. Between 2001 and 2005 Johnson conducted research on the controversial practice of chumming great white shark for tourism, often called cage diving, where he discovered evidence of conditioning, however he did not link this to increased numbers of attacks on human beings. In January 2008 he led a pilot study to Ponto Do Ora (Mozambique) on the Zambezi shark, also known as the Bull shark.

Johnson was also part of the team that tracked the Ironbound white shark in the waters south of Key Biscayne, near Miami. Ironbound was caught and tagged on October 3 off Lunenburg, Nova Scotia, and has traveled 1,473 miles down the US East Coast since then.

== Television programs ==
Between 1998 and present Johnson has featured as a marine scientist in numerous documentaries including Naked Science (National Geographic), Earth Investigated (National Geographic), Animal Camera (BBC) and After the Attack (Discovery Channel). Since 2006 he has hosted Shark Tribe with Dave Salmoni (Discovery Channel), Sharkville (National Geographic) and Shark Pit Mystery (National Geographic). In 2008, Ryan was a guest on Good Morning America with Diane Sawyer, The O'Rielly Factor with Bill O'Reilly^{25}, Fox and Friends, Inside Edition and Red Eye w/ Greg Gutfeld.

Johnson has appeared locally on South African television in productions such as 50/50, Carte Blanche and the Big Question debate show. In 2012, he joined shark taggers OCEARCH in South Africa as Chief Scientist. The expedition was filmed as a 10 part series called SHARK WRANGLERS for the History Channel.
