= University of Pretoria Faculty of Veterinary Science =

Veterinary faculty in South Africa

- Former names: Transvaal University College (1908–1930)
- Type: Public; Veterinary school
- Established: 1920
- Affiliations: University of Pretoria
- Students: 767
- Undergraduates: 535
- Postgraduates: 232
- Location: Pretoria, Gauteng, South Africa; 25.6506196°S 28.1824736°E
- Campus: Onderstepoort
Colours
Blue, gold and red
- Nickname: Tuks or Tukkies
- Mascot: Oom Gert
- Website: www.up.ac.za/faculty-of-veterinary-science

The Faculty of Veterinary Science is a faculty of the University of Pretoria. Founded in 1920, it is the second oldest veterinary faculty in Africa. With the exception of the faculties in Khartoum (Sudan, 1938), and Cairo (Egypt, 1946), all the other African faculties were established after 1960. It is the only one of its kind in South Africa and is one of 33 veterinary faculties in Africa.

Since 1997, the university as a whole has produced more research outputs every year than any other institution of higher learning in South Africa, as measured by the Department of Education's accreditation benchmark.

The Faculty offers an undergraduate veterinary degree programme and a veterinary nursing diploma programme as well as a variety of postgraduate degree programmes.

Graduates of the Faculty enjoy national and international recognition and the BVSc degree of the University of Pretoria currently enjoys recognition for registration by the Royal College of Veterinary Surgeons (RCVS) in the UK, the Australasian Veterinary Boards Council (AVBC) in Australia, New Zealand and Tasmania as well as by the relevant authorities in Malaysia.

== Facilities ==
The Faculty of Veterinary Science is situated at Onderstepoort in the north of Pretoria which is a property of 65 hectares. Onderstepoort is a generic name for a hub of three institutions in the vicinity, namely the Faculty, Onderstepoort Biological Products (OBP) and the Onderstepoort Veterinary Institute (OVI). All three institutions are independent. The Onderstepoort campus of the university is 30 km north west of the main campus in Hatfield and 15 km north of the city center of Pretoria.

The buildings on the Onderstepoort campus cover a total of 55 000 m^{2} and consist of the following:

- The Arnold Theiler building
- The Onderstepoort Veterinary Academic Hospital (OVAH)
- Department of Veterinary Tropical Diseases and support services of the central Department of Education Innovation
- Department of Anatomy and Physiology (sections of Anatomy and Histology, including electron microscopy)
- Departments of Anatomy and Physiology (section of Physiology), Centre for Veterinary Wildlife Studies
- Department of Production Animal Studies
- Department of Paraclinical Sciences (sections of Veterinary Public Health and Pathology)
- Equine Research Centre
- Camps, paddocks and animal handling facilities (including a small dairy) managed by the Onderstepoort Animal Teaching Unit (OTAU)
- Residence annexes
- Student residence and associated sports fields
- Biomedical Research Centre (UPBRC)

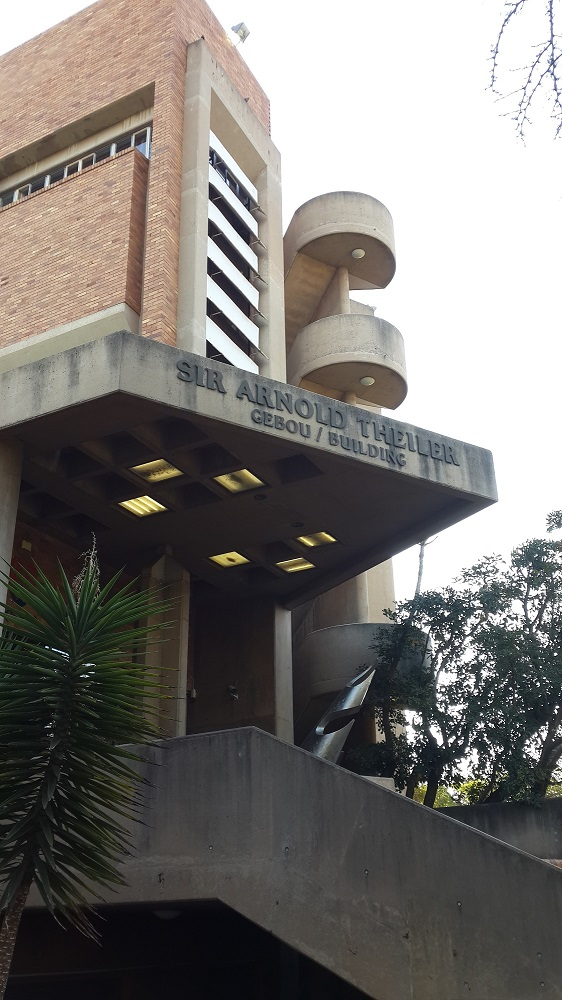
Sir Arnold Theiler Building

== Departments ==
The faculty has 5 academic departments responsible for teaching, research and service rendering. These activities are further facilitated by well developed support services provided by an academic hospital, various departmental laboratories, general and student administrative sections, a teaching animal unit and a number of research centres. The Onderstepoort Veterinary Academic Hospital provides clinical services rendered with full student participation as part of the primary teaching mission of the Faculty of Veterinary Science.

=== Anatomy and physiology ===
The Anatomy Section is responsible for teaching undergraduate- and postgraduate macroscopical and microscopical anatomy to veterinary science and nursing students. The undergraduate teaching programme includes the Electron Microscope Unit canine anatomy presented to the BSc (VetBiol) III students and comparative anatomy of equine, ruminants, porcine, birds and fish presented to the BVSc I students. MSc and PhD programmes in veterinary anatomy are presented in the department. Various postgraduate anatomy courses are also presented to students registered for the specialist MMedVet degree. The main focus of research in the department is on the anatomy of wild animals and the reproductive biology of birds and mammals.

The Veterinary Physiology Section is responsible for teaching and research in basic and applied physiology and physiological chemistry. A complete course in fundamental animal physiology and physiological chemistry is taught in the VAP 300 module presented to the BSc (VetBiol) III students, followed by a course in Applied Physiology in the BVSc I year. It is problem-based and focuses the student on the holistic approach to treating the whole animal. The Section also teaches a fundamental course in Physiology and Physiological Chemistry to the first-year DipVet student nurses. Research areas are focused upon metabolic adaptation of indigenous sheep and goats, water and electrolyte balance in sheep, and certain facets of nanotechnology.

=== Companion animal clinical studies ===
The Department of Companion Animal Clinical Studies is responsible for teaching, service rendering and research in the disciplines of Anaesthesiology, Clinical Pathology, Dentistry, Diagnostic Imaging, Ophthalmology, Equine Medicine & Surgery, and Small Animal Medicine & Surgery.

=== Paraclinical sciences ===
The Department of Paraclinical Sciences is one of five academic departments of the Faculty of Veterinary Science. The department was formed in May 2001 following restructuring at the Faculty. The department comprises four sections representing the primary disciplines of Pathology, Pharmacology, Toxicology and Veterinary Public Health. The Phytomedicine programme is also hosted in the department. While each individual section is responsible for the maintenance and development of their respective disciplines, they function as a unit in pursuing the Departmental mission.

=== Production animal studies ===
The Department of Production Animal Studies is subdivided according to activities. These divisions are:

- The Animal Production and Ethology Section is responsible for the presentation of courses in basic animal production, welfare and animal handling
- The Epidemiology Section deals with all aspects of veterinary epidemiology
- The Herd Health Section visits various production animal farms
- The Production Animal Clinical Section takes care of the medical and surgical production animal cases in the Onderstepoort Veterinary Academic Hospital and surrounding communities
- The Reproduction section teaches students about reproductive disorders and biotechnology in all species. Specialists in the section supply a service to farmers and breeders
- The Poultry Reference Centre deals with all aspects of poultry health and production in close association with the poultry industry

=== Veterinary tropical diseases ===
In the domain of Tropical Animal Health, the Department of Veterinary Tropical Diseases (DVTD) is well positioned to play a leading role, especially in research and the training of postgraduate students of the region and further afield.

== Research ==
There are four main research centres within the faculty:

- Centre for Veterinary Wildlife Studies
- Equine Research Centre
- Veterinary Pharmacovigilance Centre
- UP Biomedical Research Centre

== Academic programmes ==
The Faculty of Veterinary Science of the University of Pretoria offers a BVSc degree which is recognised by the South African Veterinary Council for registration as Veterinarian which entitles the holder to practice as a veterinarian. It is also recognised as such by the Royal College of Veterinary Surgeons (RCVS) in the UK, the Australasian Veterinary Boards Council (AVBC) in Australia, New Zealand and Tasmania as well as by the relevant authorities in Malaysia. It also offer a University Diploma in Veterinary Nursing (DipVetNurs; also referred to as DVN) which is recognised by the South African Veterinary Council for registration as Veterinary Nurse which entitles the holder to practise the profession of veterinary nursing.

The faculty also offers a number of postgraduate courses including BVSc Honours, MMedVet, MSc, PhD and DVSc courses.

The undergraduate veterinary programme has developed from the original 5-year programme to a five-and-a-half-year programme in the mid-1970s, 1980s and early 1990s. It was changed to a 6-year programme in the late 1990s and to a split degree structure consisting of a 3-year BSc (Veterinary Biology) degree and 4-year BVSc degree in 2003. Since 2011, students who are already enrolled in the programme will need 3 years to complete the BSc (Veterinary Biology) degree and another 4 years for the 4-year BVSc degree; a total of 7 years. Students who will be admitted to the new degree programme from 2011 onwards will need only 6 years to complete the programme. The first 2 – 3 cohorts of students in the new programme will also take 7 years to complete the programme due to transitional arrangements.

== Accommodation ==
The faculty's first residence opened in 1924, the same year as its first year students, all eight of them, graduated. Intake remained small, below the 20 mark, until 1956, with the first batch to exceed 40 qualifying in 1967. Number fluctuated around the 40 mark until 1978 with 69 graduates in 1979. It remained around the 85 students a year mark until 2007. In 2008 a total of 99 students graduated and this grew to 119 in 2009.

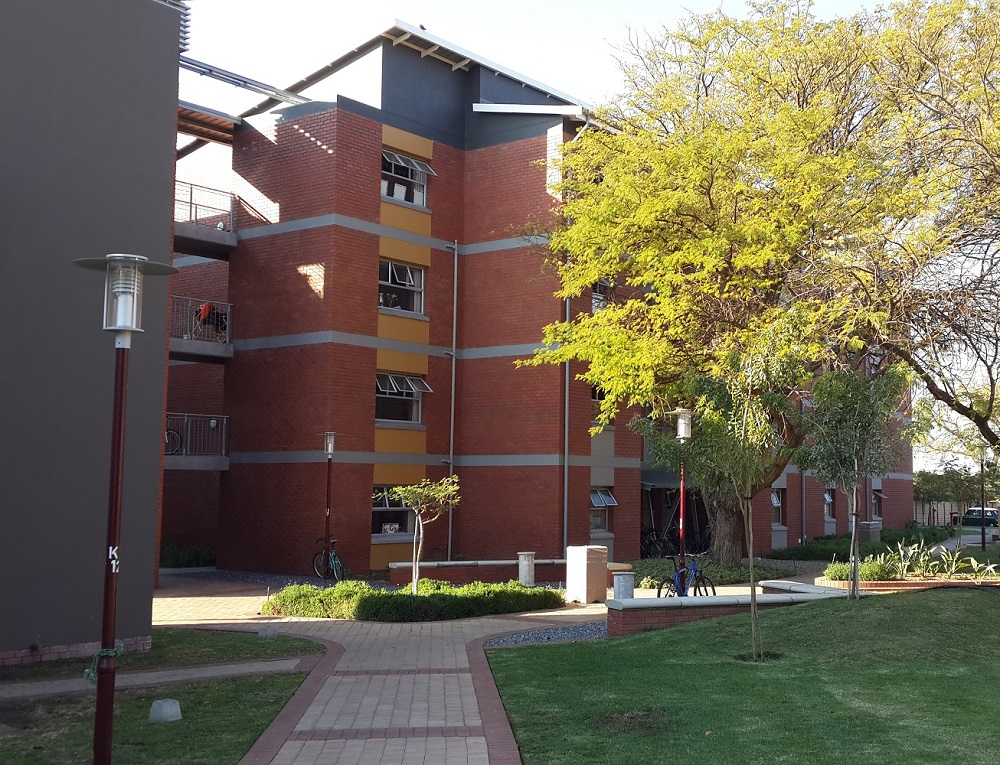
Onderstepoort new residence

The residence at the Faculty is known as House Onderstepoort. House Onderstepoort is unique among all the UP residences in that both undergraduate and postgraduate students are accommodated. The current number of students who can be accommodated at the Onderstepoort campus is 604. In May 2010 a R90m accommodation project was started to increase and improve the accommodation facilities at the campus. The improvements made Onderstepoort the second largest University sustained residence at the University of Pretoria. The new accommodation was made for 144 students, 48 postgraduate students and 24 doing post-doctoral work. The new facilities were officially opened on 22 February. The size of the residence is a major factor in the number of students that the faculty can accept, and being the only veterinary faculty in South Africa, they are trying to provide for the high demand of Veterinarians. The infrastructure around the residence, including roads and parking areas, as well as landscaping, was improved. Existing facilities and the security of the residence were also upgraded and refurbished.

== Deans of the Faculty of Veterinary Science ==
- Arnold Theiler
- Petrus Johann du Toit
