= Arnold Theiler =

Swiss-born South African veterinarian (1867–1936)

Sir Arnold Theiler KCMG
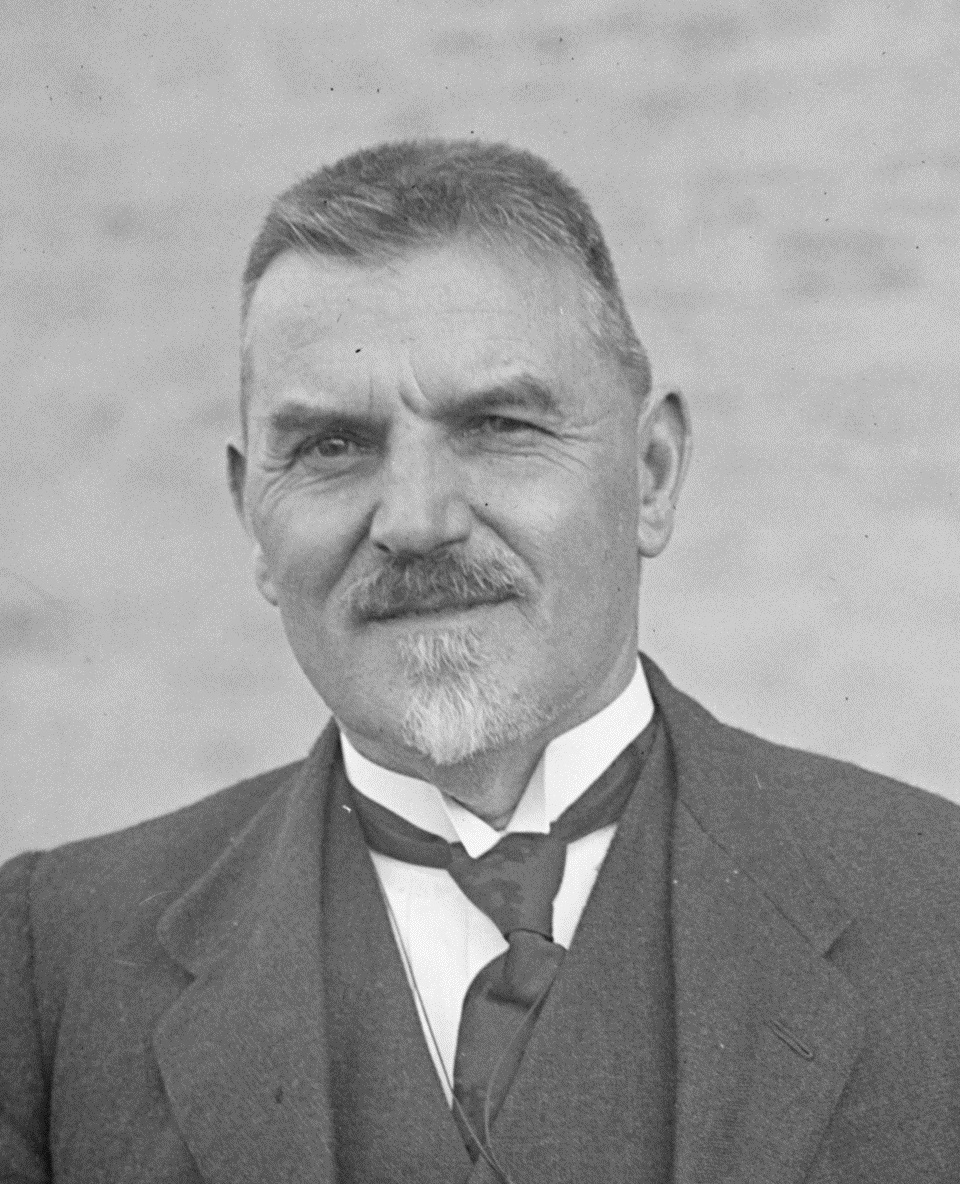
- Theiler in 1923
- Born: 26 March 1867; Frick, Canton of Aargau, Switzerland
- Died: 24 July 1936 (aged 69); London, England
- Citizenship: South African citizenship
- Education: University of Zurich
- Spouse: Emma Sophie Jegge
- Children: Hans, Margaret, Gertrud, Max
- Awards: K.C.M.G.
- Scientific career
- Fields: Veterinary infectious diseases

Sir Arnold Theiler KCMG (26 March 1867 – 24 July 1936) Pour le Mérite is considered to be the father of veterinary science in South Africa. He was born in Frick, Canton Aargau, Switzerland. He received his higher education, and later qualified as a veterinarian, in Zurich. In 1891, Theiler travelled to South Africa and at first found employment as a farm worker on Irene Estates near Pretoria, owned by Nellmapius, but later that year started practising as a veterinarian.

His success at producing a vaccine to combat an outbreak of smallpox among the miners of the Witwatersrand brought him an appointment as state veterinarian for the Zuid-Afrikaansche Republiek, in which capacity he served during the Anglo-Boer War of 1899–1902. During this period his research team developed a vaccine against rinderpest, a malignant and contagious disease of cattle. His tremendous energy, pioneering spirit and professional integrity brought him international recognition.

He described in 1919 what is now known as Theiler's disease, a major cause of acute hepatitis in horses. This disease is now known to be caused by a parvovirus.

Theiler was the first director of the Onderstepoort Veterinary Research Institute, outside Pretoria. This institute under his leadership carried out research on African horse sickness, sleeping sickness, malaria, East Coast fever (Theileria parva) and tick-borne diseases such as redwater, heartwater and biliary. The University of Pretoria Faculty of Veterinary Science was established there in 1920 which enabled veterinarians to train locally for the first time. Theiler became the first dean of this faculty.

He married Emma Sophie Jegge (1861–1951) and had two sons and two daughters, the younger two of whom worked at Onderstepoort: Hans (1894–1947), a veterinarian; Margaret (1896–1988), a teacher; Gertrud (1897–1986), a parasitologist and professor; and Max Theiler (1899–1972), a Nobel laureate in 1951 in Physiology and Medicine.
