= East Coast fever =

Tick-borne disease of cattle

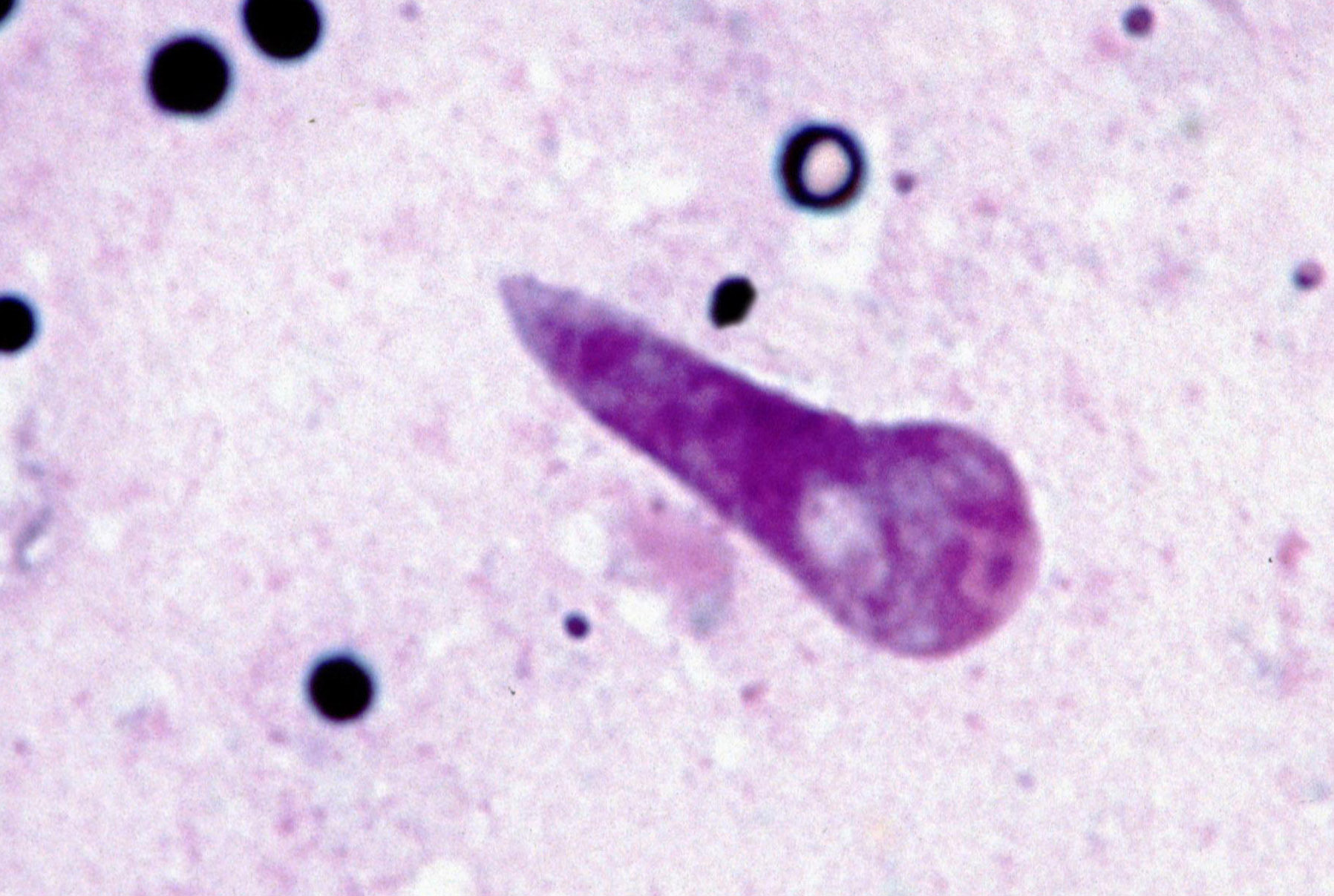
Kinete stage of Theileria parva in the transmitting tick Rhipicephalus appendiculatus

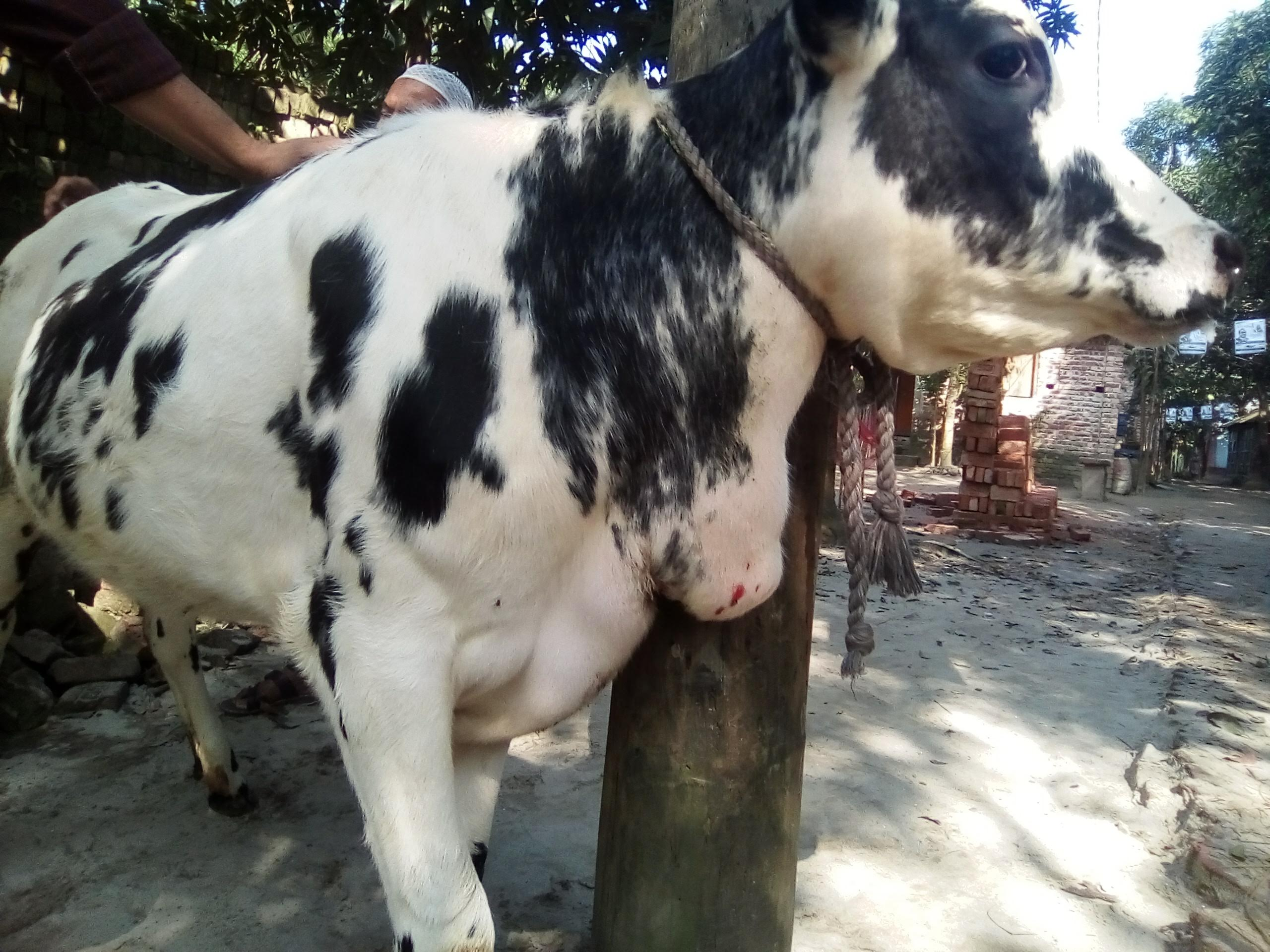
Brisket edema in theileriosis

East Coast fever, also known as theileriosis, is a disease of cattle which occurs in Africa and is caused by the protozoan parasite Theileria parva. The primary vector which spreads T. parva between cattle is a tick, Rhipicephalus appendiculatus. East Coast fever is of major economic importance to livestock farmers in Africa, killing at least one million cattle each year. The disease occurs in Burundi, Democratic Republic of Congo, Kenya, Malawi, Mozambique, Rwanda, South Sudan, Tanzania, Uganda, Zimbabwe, Zambia. In 2003, East Coast fever was introduced to Comoros by cattle imported from Tanzania. It has been eradicated in South Africa.

A more acute form of East Coast fever called corridor disease occurs when buffalo-derived T. parva is transmitted to cattle. Another form, called January disease, only occurs over the winter months in Zimbabwe due to the tick lifecycle.

Native cattle are often resistant to the parasite, but not without symptoms. They are hosts to the parasite, but do not suffer as severely as foreign cattle.

== Clinical signs and diagnosis ==
Mortality can be up to 100%, with death occurring around 18–30 days after the initial attachment of infected ticks, because the incubation required is around 10–25 days, and the parasite spreads quickly and is rather aggressive.

Clinical signs include fever and enlarged lymph nodes near the tick bites.

Smears and stains can also be done to check for the parasite. Schizonts (meronts, or segmentors) can be found in infected lymphocytes. Pathology includes anorexia, dyspnea, corneal opacity, nasal discharge, frothy nasal discharge, diarrhea, pulmonary edema, leukopenia, and anemia. Endemic cattle given medication sometimes recover to varying degrees, or death follows due to blocked capillaries and parasites infecting the central nervous system. Cattle in endemic areas which survive infection become carriers.

For diagnosis, post mortem findings are characteristic and mainly include damage to the lymphoid and respiratory systems.

== Treatment and control ==
One study using the medicinal plant Peganum harmala showed it to have a lifesaving effect on cattle infected with East Coast fever.

The classical treatment with tetracyclines (1970–1990) cannot provide efficiency above 50%.

Since the early 1990s, buparvaquone has been used in bovine theileriosis with 90 to 98% recovery.

Other than buparvaquone, another chemotherapeutic option is parvaquone, e.g. Clexon. Halofuginone lactate has also been shown to have an 80.5% efficacy against Theirelia parva parva infections. The ultimate factor that causes death is pulmonary edema. In May 2010, a vaccine to protect cattle against East Coast fever reportedly had been approved and registered by the governments of Kenya, Malawi and Tanzania. This consists of cryopreserved sporozoites from crushed ticks, but it is expensive and can cause disease.

Control of the disease relies on control of ticks of domestic animals. This is a major concern in tropical countries with large livestock populations, especially in the endemic area. Pesticides (acaricides) are applied in dipping baths or spray races, and cattle breeds with good ability to acquire immune resistance to the vector ticks are used.

Future treatment and control research will be informed by Gardner et al 2005's genome and protein expression and Bishop et al 2005's expression-by-stage and antigen results.

== History ==
This disease was first reported in southern Africa, south of the Zambezi river, in 1902. It became known as East Coast fever after it was determined that the disease had originated in cattle imported from the East Coast of Africa.
