= Onderstepoort =

- Location within Gauteng Location within South Africa
- Coordinates: 25°39′S 28°11′E
- Country: South Africa
- Province: Gauteng
- Municipality: City of Tshwane

Area
  - Total: 6.69 km^{2} (2.58 sq mi)

Population (2001)
  - Total: 769
  - Density: 115/km^{2} (298/sq mi)
- Time zone: UTC+2 (SAST)
- PO box: 0110
- Area code: 054

Onderstepoort is a town situated north of Pretoria in Gauteng, South Africa.

Onderstepoort Veterinary Institute and the University of Pretoria Faculty of Veterinary Science, founded by Sir Arnold Theiler, is also situated here. The institute is known for tropical disease research, and the veterinary faculty has strong ties with the Royal College of Veterinary Science in the United Kingdom.

== History ==
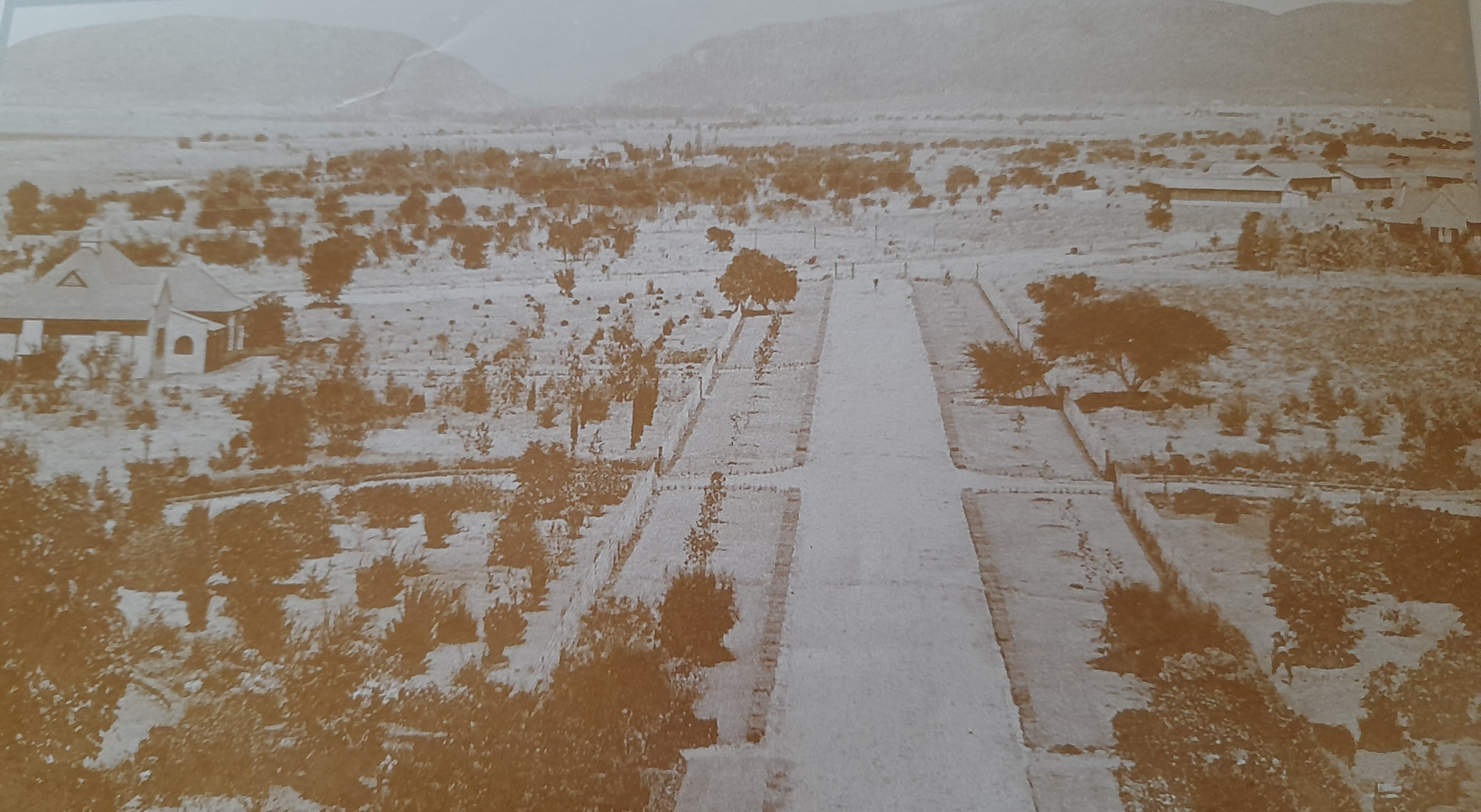
Onderstepoort in 1910.
