= Plasmodium agamae =

Scientific classification
- Domain: Eukaryota
- Clade: Sar
- Clade: Alveolata
- Phylum: Apicomplexa
- Class: Aconoidasida
- Order: Haemospororida
- Family: Plasmodiidae
- Genus: Plasmodium
- Species: P. agamae

Binomial name
- Plasmodium agamae Wenyon, 1909

Species of single-celled organism

Plasmodium agamae is a parasite of the genus Plasmodium subgenus Sauramoeba. As in all Plasmodium species, it has both vertebrate and insect hosts. The vertebrate host is the rainbow lizard (Agama agama). The vectors are Lutzomyia or Culicoides species.

== Taxonomy ==
This species was described by Wenyon in 1909.

== Description ==
The schizonts produce 8 merozoites.

== Distribution ==
P. agamae is distributed throughout much of Africa.

== Hosts ==
Host species infected by this parasite include Agama colonorum.

Infection with P. agamae induces anaemia in its host which in turn reduces running stamina. Infection with P. agamae alone does not reduce the number of eggs laid by the females but simultaneous coinfection with P. giganteum may result in a reduction in the clutch size by two thirds.

Fever occurs but is irregular.
