= Plasmodium hermani =

Scientific classification
- Domain: Eukaryota
- Clade: Sar
- Clade: Alveolata
- Phylum: Apicomplexa
- Class: Aconoidasida
- Order: Haemospororida
- Family: Plasmodiidae
- Genus: Plasmodium
- Species: P. hermani

Binomial name
- Plasmodium hermani Telford and Forrester, 1975

Species of single-celled organism

Plasmodium hermani is a parasite of the genus Plasmodium subgenus Huffia. As in all Plasmodium species, P. hermani has both vertebrate and insect hosts. The vertebrate hosts for this parasite are birds.

== Description ==
This species was first described in 1975 by Telford and Forrester in a wild turkey.

== Geographical occurrence ==
This species is found in Florida, USA.

== Vectors ==
- Culex nigripalpus
- Culex restuans
- Culex salinarius
- Wyeomyia vanduzeei

Note: Cx. nigripalpus appears to be the main natural vector.

== Clinical features and host pathology ==
This species infects knots (Calidris canutus), bobwhites (Colinus virginianus) and turkeys (Meleagris gallopavo).

Infection of turkeys causes anaemia, splenomegaly and decreased growth but is not normally fatal.
