= Plasmodium beltrani =

Scientific classification
- Domain: Eukaryota
- Clade: Sar
- Clade: Alveolata
- Phylum: Apicomplexa
- Class: Aconoidasida
- Order: Haemospororida
- Family: Plasmodiidae
- Genus: Plasmodium
- Species: P. beltrani

Binomial name
- Plasmodium beltrani Peláez and Perez-Reyes, 1952

Species of single-celled organism

Plasmodium beltrani is a parasite of the genus Plasmodium subgenus Sauramoeba. As in all Plasmodium species, P. beltrani has both vertebrate and insect hosts. The vertebrate hosts for this parasite are spiny lizards.

== Taxonomy ==
This species was described by Peláez and Perez-Reyes in Sceloporus variabilis in 1952.

== Description ==
P. beltrani infects some lizards of the genus Sceloporus. Its schizonts produce 23-48 merozoites, and its male and female gametocytes are the same size.

== Distribution ==
The parasite was initially isolated in Oaxaca, Mexico. However, it has also been found in Veracruz and Chiapas.

== Hosts ==
While P. beltrani was originally isolated from Sceloporus variabilis, it has also been found in Sceloporus teapensis and Sceloporus malachiticus. In all known vertebrate hosts, P. beltrani appears to infect red blood cells. This infection deforms the red blood cells, however it is not known whether or to what extent this affects the health of the host.
