= List of Wyeomyia species =

These 149 species belong to Wyeomyia, a genus of mosquitoes in the family Culicidae.

== Wyeomyia species ==
- Wyeomyia abebela Dyar and Knab, 1908^{i c g}
- Wyeomyia ablechra Dyar & Knab, 1908^{c g}
- Wyeomyia adelpha Dyar & Knab, 1906^{c g}
- Wyeomyia aequatoriana Levi-castillo, 1954^{i}
- Wyeomyia aequatorianna Levi-Castillo, 1954^{c g}
- Wyeomyia airosai Lane & Cerqueria, 1942^{c g}
- Wyeomyia alani Lane and Cerqueira, 1957^{i c g}
- Wyeomyia albosquamata Bonne-Wepster & Bonne, 1919^{c g}
- Wyeomyia amazonica Levi-castillo, 1954^{i c g}
- Wyeomyia aningae Motta & Lourenco-de-Oliveira, 2005^{c g}
- Wyeomyia antillarum Floch and Abonnenc, 1945^{i}
- Wyeomyia antunesi Lane & Guimaraes, 1937^{c g}
- Wyeomyia aphobema Dyar, 1918^{i c g}
- Wyeomyia aporonoma Dyar & Knab, 1906^{c g}
- Wyeomyia arborea Galindo, 1951^{i c g}
- Wyeomyia argenteorostris (Bonne-Wepster & Bonne, 1920)^{c g}
- Wyeomyia arthrostigma (Lutz, 1905)^{i c g}
- Wyeomyia atrata Belkin & Heinemann, 1970^{c g}
- Wyeomyia autocratica Dyar & Knab, 1906^{c g}
- Wyeomyia bahama Dyar and Knab, 1906^{i c g}
- Wyeomyia bicornis (Root, 1928)^{i c g}
- Wyeomyia bonnei Lane & Cerqueira, 1942^{c g}
- Wyeomyia bourrouli (Lutz, 1905)^{c g}
- Wyeomyia caracula Dyarand Nunez Tovar, 1927^{i c g}
- Wyeomyia carrilloi (Sutil & Pulido, 1978)^{c g}
- Wyeomyia celaenocephala Dyar and Knab, 1906^{i c g}
- Wyeomyia cesari Ponte & Cerqueira, 1938^{c g}
- Wyeomyia chalcocephala Dyar & Knab, 1906^{c g}
- Wyeomyia charmion Dyar, 1928^{i c g}
- Wyeomyia chocoensis Porter & Wolff, 2004^{c g}
- Wyeomyia circumcincta Dyar & Knab, 1907^{c g}
- Wyeomyia clasoleuca Dyar & Knab, 1908^{c g}
- Wyeomyia codiocampa Dyar and Knab, 1907^{i c g}
- Wyeomyia coenonus Howard, Dyar & Knab, 1913^{c g}
- Wyeomyia colombiana Lane, 1945^{i c g}
- Wyeomyia complosa (Dyar, 1928)^{c g}
- Wyeomyia compta Senevet & Abonnenc, 1939^{c g}
- Wyeomyia confusa (Lutz, 1905)^{c g}
- Wyeomyia corona Belkin & Heinemann, 1970^{c g}
- Wyeomyia covagarciai Sutil Oramas & Pulido F., 1974^{c g}
- Wyeomyia davisi Lane & Cerqueira, 1942^{c g}
- Wyeomyia deanei Oliveira, 1983^{c g}
- Wyeomyia diabolica Lane & Forattini, 1952^{c g}
- Wyeomyia downsi Lane, 1945^{i c g}
- Wyeomyia dyari Lane and Cerqueira, 1942^{i c g}
- Wyeomyia edwardsi Lane & Cerqueira, 1942^{c g}
- Wyeomyia esmeraldasi Levi-Castillo, 1955^{c g}
- Wyeomyia felicia (Dyar & Nunez Tovar, 1927)^{c g}
- Wyeomyia fernandezyepezi Cova Garcia, Sutil Oramas, & Pulido F., 1974^{c g}
- Wyeomyia finlayi Lane & Cerqueria, 1942^{c g}
- Wyeomyia fishi Zavortink, 1986^{c g}
- Wyeomyia flabellata Lane & Cerqueira, 1942^{c g}
- Wyeomyia flavifacies Edwards, 1922^{i c g}
- Wyeomyia florestan Dyar, 1925^{i c g}
- Wyeomyia flui (Bonne-Wepster & Bonne, 1919)^{c g}
- Wyeomyia forattinii Clastrier, 1974^{c g}
- Wyeomyia forcipenis Lourenco-de-Oliveira & Silva, 1985^{c g}
- Wyeomyia fuscipes Edwards, 1922^{c g}
- Wyeomyia galvaoi Correa & Ramalho, 1956^{c g}
- Wyeomyia gaudians Dyar & Nunez Tovar, 1927^{c g}
- Wyeomyia gausapata Dyar and Nunez Tovar, 1927^{i c g}
- Wyeomyia grayii Theobald, 1901^{c g}
- Wyeomyia guadians Dyar and Nunez Tovar, 1927^{i g}
- Wyeomyia guatemala Dyar & Knab, 1906^{c g}
- Wyeomyia gutierrezi Duret, 1971^{c g}
- Wyeomyia haynei Dodge, 1947^{i c g}
- Wyeomyia hemisagnosta Dyar and Knab, 1906^{i c g}
- Wyeomyia hirsuta (Hill and Hill, 1946)^{i c g}
- Wyeomyia hosautos Dyar and Knab, 1907^{i c g}
- Wyeomyia howardi Lane & Cerqueira, 1942^{c g}
- Wyeomyia incaudata Root, 1928^{c g}
- Wyeomyia ininicola Fauran, 1974^{c g}
- Wyeomyia intonca Dyar & Knab, 1909^{c g}
- Wyeomyia juxtahirsuta Belkin & Heinemann, 1970^{c g}
- Wyeomyia knabi Lane & Cerqueria, 1942^{c g}
- Wyeomyia kummi Lane and Cerqueira, 1942^{i c g}
- Wyeomyia labesba Howard, Dyar & Knab, 1913^{c g}
- Wyeomyia lamellata (Bonne-Wepster & Bonne, 1919)^{c g}
- Wyeomyia lassalli (Bonne-Wepster & Bonne, 1921)^{c g}
- Wyeomyia lateralis Petrocchi, 1927^{i c g}
- Wyeomyia leucostigma Lutz, 1904^{i c g}
- Wyeomyia leucotarsis Lane, 1936^{c g}
- Wyeomyia limai Lane & Cerqueira, 1942^{c g}
- Wyeomyia longirostris Theobald, 1901^{c g}
- Wyeomyia lopesi Correa & Ramalho, 1956^{c g}
- Wyeomyia lopezii Cova Garcia, Sutil Oramas, & Pulido F., 1974^{c g}
- Wyeomyia luna Belkin & Heinemann, 1970^{c g}
- Wyeomyia luteoventralis Theobald, 1901^{i c g}
- Wyeomyia lutzi (Lima, 1904)^{i c g}
- Wyeomyia malonopus Dyar, 1919^{i g}
- Wyeomyia mattinglyi Lane, 1953^{i c g}
- Wyeomyia medioalbipes Lutz, 1904^{i c g}
- Wyeomyia melanocephala Dyar and Knab, 1906^{i c g}
- Wyeomyia melanopus Dyar, 1919^{c g}
- Wyeomyia mitchellii (Theobald, 1905)^{i c g b} (bromeliad mosquito)
- Wyeomyia moerbista (Dyar and Knab, 1919)^{i c g}
- Wyeomyia muehlensi Petrocchi, 1927^{c g}
- Wyeomyia mystes Dyar, 1924^{i c g}
- Wyeomyia negrensis Gordon and Evans, 1922^{i c g}
- Wyeomyia nigricephala Clastrier & Claustre, 1978^{c g}
- Wyeomyia nigritubus Galindo, Carpenter, Trapido, 1951^{i c g}
- Wyeomyia nunezia Dyar, 1928^{i g}
- Wyeomyia oblita (Lutz, 1904)^{i c g}
- Wyeomyia occulta Bonne-wepster and Bonne, 1919^{i c g}
- Wyeomyia pallidoventer Theobald, 1907^{c g}
- Wyeomyia palmata Lane & Cerqueira, 1942^{c g}
- Wyeomyia pampithes (Dyar and Nunez Tovar, 1928)^{i c g}
- Wyeomyia personata (Lutz, 1904)^{i}
- Wyeomyia pertinans (Williston, 1896)^{i c g}
- Wyeomyia petrocchiae (Shannon and Del Ponte, 1927)^{i}
- Wyeomyia phroso Howard, Dyar, Knab, 1915^{i c g}
- Wyeomyia pilicauda Root, 1928^{c g}
- Wyeomyia pseudopecten Dyar and Knab, 1906^{i c g}
- Wyeomyia pseudorobusta Pajot & Fauran, 1975^{c g}
- Wyeomyia quasilongirostris Theobald, 1907^{c g}
- Wyeomyia quasiluteoventralis (Theobald, 1903)^{i}
- Wyeomyia robusta Senevet and Abonnenc, 1939^{i c g}
- Wyeomyia rooti (Del Ponte, 1939)^{i c g}
- Wyeomyia rorotai Senevet & Chabelard, 1942^{c g}
- Wyeomyia roucouyana (Bonne-wepster and Bonne, 1927)^{i c g}
- Wyeomyia sabethea Lane and Cerqueira, 1842^{i c g}
- Wyeomyia schnusei (Martini, 1931)^{i}
- Wyeomyia scotinomus (Dyar and Knab, 1907)^{i c g}
- Wyeomyia serrata (Lutz, 1905)^{i c g}
- Wyeomyia serratoria (Dyar and Nunez Tovar, 1927)^{i c g}
- Wyeomyia shannoni Lane and Cerqueira, 1942^{i c g}
- Wyeomyia simmsi Dyar and Knab, 1908)^{i c g}
- Wyeomyia smithii (Coquillett, 1901)^{i c g b} (pitcherplant mosquito)
- Wyeomyia sororcula Dyar & Knab, 1906^{c g}
- Wyeomyia splendida Bonne-Wepster & Bonne, 1919^{c g}
- Wyeomyia staminifera Lourenco-de-Oliveira, Motta & de Castro, 1992^{c g}
- Wyeomyia stellata Belkin & Heinemann, 1970^{c g}
- Wyeomyia stonei Vargas, Martinez, Palacios, 1953^{i c g}
- Wyeomyia subcomplosa (Del Ponte, 1939)^{i c g}
- Wyeomyia surinamensis Bruijning, 1959^{c g}
- Wyeomyia tarsata Lane and Cerqueira, 1942^{i c g}
- Wyeomyia taurepana Anduze, 1941^{i c g}
- Wyeomyia telestica Dyar and Knab, 1906^{i}
- Wyeomyia testei Senevet and Abonnenc, 1939^{i c g}
- Wyeomyia theobaldi Lane & Cerqueira, 1942^{c g}
- Wyeomyia trifurcata Clastrier, 1973^{c g}
- Wyeomyia trinidadensis Theobald, 1901^{c g}
- Wyeomyia tripartita (Bonne-Wepster & Bonne, 1921)^{c g}
- Wyeomyia trujilloi Pulido F. & Sutil O., 1981^{c g}
- Wyeomyia ulocoma (Theobald, 1903)^{i c g}
- Wyeomyia undulata Del Ponte and Cerqueira, 1938^{i c g}
- Wyeomyia vanduzeei Dyar & Knab, 1906^{i c g b}
- Wyeomyia ypsipola Dyar, 1922^{i c g}
- Wyeomyia zinzala Zavortink, 1986^{c g}

Data sources: i = ITIS, c = Catalogue of Life, g = GBIF, b = Bugguide.net
