= Plasmodium pessoai =

Scientific classification
- Domain: Eukaryota
- Clade: Sar
- Clade: Alveolata
- Phylum: Apicomplexa
- Class: Aconoidasida
- Order: Haemospororida
- Family: Plasmodiidae
- Genus: Plasmodium
- Species: P. pessoai

Binomial name
- Plasmodium pessoai Ayala et al., 1978

Species of single-celled organism

Plasmodium pessoai is a parasite of the genus Plasmodium. As in all Plasmodium species, P. pessoai has both vertebrate and insect hosts. The vertebrate hosts for this parasite are reptiles.

== Taxonomy ==
The parasite was first described by Ayala et al. in 1978. The species is named after Dr Samuel B Pessoa - a parasitologist at the Instituto Butantan, São Paulo, Brazil.

Morphologically this species appears to be related to Plasmodium aurulentum.

== Description ==
The gametocytes are small and sausage shaped (10.4 x 4.6 micrometres)

Immature schizonts often contain a digestive vacuole.

Mature schizonts are spherical or bouquet-shaped and produce 22 - 32 merozoites. They may possess an intensely staining magenta or rose-coloured substance in the matrix of the surrounding vacuole.

== Distribution ==
This species is found in Costa Rica, Central America.

== Hosts ==
Plasmodium pessoai is one of several species known to infect snakes. Other examples are Plasmodium wenyoni and Plasmodium tomodoni. This species infects the rat snake (Spilotes pullatus) and the bush master (Lachesis muta). Plasmodium bitis and infects Viperidae, Plasmodium pythonis infects Python sebae, and Plasmodium melanoleuca infects Elapidae.
