= Ophidiella =

Scientific classification
- Domain: Eukaryota
- Clade: Sar
- Clade: Alveolata
- Phylum: Apicomplexa
- Class: Aconoidasida
- Order: Haemospororida
- Family: Plasmodiidae
- Genus: Plasmodium
- Subgenus: Ophidiella; Garnham, 1966

Subgenus of single-celled organisms

Ophidiella is a subgenus of the genus Plasmodium described in 1966 by Garnham.

It was created as a subgenus for the then only known species infecting snakes - Plasmodium wenyoni.

== Species ==
- Plasmodium pessoai
- Plasmodium tomodoni
- Plasmodium wenyoni
