= Plasmodium rhadinurum =

Scientific classification
- Domain: Eukaryota
- Clade: Sar
- Clade: Alveolata
- Phylum: Apicomplexa
- Class: Aconoidasida
- Order: Haemospororida
- Family: Plasmodiidae
- Genus: Plasmodium
- Species: P. rhadinurum

Binomial name
- Plasmodium rhadinurum Thompson and Huff, 1944

Species of single-celled organism

Plasmodium rhadinurum is a parasite of the genus Plasmodium subgenus Carinamoeba.

Like all Plasmodium species P. rhadinurum has both vertebrate and insect hosts. The vertebrate hosts for this parasite are reptiles.

== Description ==
The parasite was first described by Thompson and Huff in 1944.

The schizonts give rise to 4 - 8 merozoites.

The gametocytes are round or elongate and may encircle the nucleus.

== Distribution ==
This species is found in Venezuela.

== Hosts ==
This species infects the lizard Iguana iguana iguana.
