= Plasmodium heischi =

Scientific classification
- Domain: Eukaryota
- Clade: Sar
- Clade: Alveolata
- Phylum: Apicomplexa
- Class: Aconoidasida
- Order: Haemospororida
- Family: Plasmodiidae
- Genus: Plasmodium
- Species: P. heischi

Binomial name
- Plasmodium heischi Garnham and Telford, 1984

Species of single-celled organism

Plasmodium heischi is a parasite of the genus Plasmodium subgenus Sauramoeba. As in all Plasmodium species P. heischi, has both vertebrate and insect hosts. The vertebrate hosts for this parasite are reptiles.

== Taxonomy ==
The parasite was first described by Garnham and Telford in 1984.

== Description ==
Plasmodium heischi produces spindle-shaped gametocytes.

== Distribution ==
This species was described in Kenya.

== Hosts ==
The only host for this species are the skinks Mabuya striata.
