= P. giganteum =

P. giganteum may refer to:

- Piptostigma giganteum, a plant species endemic to Nigeria
- Plasmodium giganteum, a parasite species

== See also ==
- Giganteum
