= Plasmodium lygosomae =

Scientific classification
- Domain: Eukaryota
- Clade: Sar
- Clade: Alveolata
- Phylum: Apicomplexa
- Class: Aconoidasida
- Order: Haemospororida
- Family: Plasmodiidae
- Genus: Plasmodium
- Species: P. lygosomae

Binomial name
- Plasmodium lygosomae Laird, 1951

Species of parasitic protist that can cause malaria

Plasmodium lygosomae is a parasite of the genus Plasmodium subgenus Carinamoeba.

Like all Plasmodium species P. lygosomae has both vertebrate and insect hosts. The vertebrate hosts for this parasite are reptiles.

== Description ==
The parasite was first described by Laird in 1951.

The schizonts give rise to 4 merozoites.

The gametocytes are elongate in form.

== Distribution ==
This species is found in New Zealand.

== Hosts ==
The only known host is the lizard Lygosoma moco. This host species has recently been renamed Oligosoma moco.
