= Plasmodium volans =

Scientific classification
- Domain: Eukaryota
- Clade: Sar
- Clade: Alveolata
- Phylum: Apicomplexa
- Class: Aconoidasida
- Order: Haemospororida
- Family: Plasmodiidae
- Genus: Plasmodium
- Species: P. volans

Binomial name
- Plasmodium volans Telford, 1995

Species of single-celled organism

Plasmodium volans is a parasite of the genus Plasmodium subgenus Carinamoeba.

Like all Plasmodium species P. volans has both vertebrate and insect hosts. The vertebrate hosts for this parasite are reptiles.

== Taxonomy ==
The parasite was first described by Telford in 1995.

== Description ==
The schizonts produce 4 – 6 merozoites.

The gametocytes are elongated.

== Distribution ==
This species is found in the Philippines and Sarawak, Malaysia.

== Hosts ==
The only known host of this species is the flying lizard Draco volans.
