= Polychromophilus murinus =

Scientific classification
- Domain: Eukaryota
- Supergroup: Alveolata
- Phylum: Apicomplexa
- Class: Aconoidasida
- Order: Haemospororida
- Family: Plasmodiidae
- Genus: Polychromophilus
- Species: P. murinus

Binomial name
- Polychromophilus murinus Dionisi, 1899

Species of single-celled organism

Polychromophilus murinus are obligate intracellular parasites that infect Vespertilionid bats. The parasite is transmitted via several species of Nyceribiidae (vector). P. murinus plays a malarial-like role in a variety of Vespertillionid bat species, with a wide geological distribution. It follows a typical haemosporidian life cycle, with mature gametocytes of the parasite taking over the bat hosts red blood cells as the key sign of infection. P. murinus is recorded in Europe, Asia, and Madagascar, and one recording in Panama. There are no climatic or seasonal variables in relation to infection, but has sporadic periods of infection intensity in bat species. There is not a large or known pathogenic effect on the bat host; while it does burst red blood cells, there is a lower degree of infection compared to other malarial species, so it does not cause anemia. Fever is a possible sign of pathology, but since bats are heterotherms, it is argued whether fever is possible. Overall, there is no form of pathology agreed upon caused by P. murinus and no current treatment.

== Phylogenetics / taxonomy ==
Polychromophilus parasites are a monophyletic clade with two genetically distinct subclades, P. melanipherus, and P. murinus. Chumnandee et al. quote previous works on other distinct subclades under Polychromophilus: P. adami, P. corradetti, and P. deanei. It should be noted however that these three species have limited and dated information. Another study on these three species by Rasoanoro et al. shows Polychromophilus sp. parasites in a range of bat hosts, while there were several unidentified genetically distinct species under the genus, a connection to P. adami, P. corradetti, or P. deanei was not noted.

Polychromophilus's most recent common ancestor is the avian/reptilian Plasmodium, showing a distant relationship between Polychromophilus to Plasmodium and mammalian Hepatocystis.

Polychromophilus murinus is one genus under many of the family Plasmodiidae, which consists of five species:

- P. adami, - infects African Miniopterus bats.
- P. corradetti - infects African Miniopterus bats.
- P. deanei - infects Myotis nigricans (recorded in Brazil).
- P. melanipherus - infects Miniopterus bats.
- P. murinus - infects Vespertilionidae bats.

== Hosts / vectors ==
=== Bats ===
Polychromophilus murinus is reported to infect the family Vespertilionidae. The bat species below are recorded across different studies of where P. murinus was found, within different geological contexts.

==== Species found with infection ====
Eptesicus serotinus, Kerivoula hardwickii, Laephotis capensis, Myotis bechsteinii, Myotis blythii, Myotis crypticus, Myotis daubentonii, Myotis goudoti, Myotis Myotis, Myotis nattereri, Myotis nigricans , Myotis siligorensis, Neoromicia grandidieri, Nyctalus noctula, Scotophilus robustus, Vespertilio murinus

=== Bat flies ===
The family Nyceribiidae are wingless, permanent, obligate ectoparasitic bat flies. Bat flies are vectors for Polychromophilus parasites. Various species of Nyceribiidae are highly host-specific, although some infect multiple bat hosts, observations show a small amount of non-primary host infections. The bat flies listed below have been found to carry P. murinus to bat hosts, these species of bat fly can carry other Polychromophilus species as well.

==== Species found with infection ====
Basilia nana, Basilia nattereri, Nycteribia kolenatti, Nycteribia latreilii, Nycrteribia pediculuaria, Nycteribia vexata, Penicillidia dufourii

==== Bat fly reproduction in relation to bats ====
Bat flies reproduce via viviparious puparity, the female bat flies lay the final larval stage onto the roost wall, and this 3rd instar larvae will develop into a puparium quickly, followed by three to four weeks of pupal development. The now-adult bat fly will exit the chrysalis when it senses a juvenile bat host nearby, introducing Polychromophilus murinus at early development.

== Life cycle ==
The Nycterbiidae species carry Polychromophilus murinus sporozoites through the salivary glands until they get a blood meal from the bat host. The sporozoites are then injected into the bat host while blood-feeding; in the host schizogony occurs in various organs (exo-erythrocytic) of the reticuloendothelial system. This results in merozoites being released, that then invade erythrocytes, developing into sexual gametocytes when in the red blood cells, a key sign of infection by P. murinus . These gametocytes are taken back up by the bat fly, which then undergo sexual reproduction (gametogony), producing an oocyst, which will then develop sporozoites on the gut wall of the vector. Effectively restarting the life cycle, these sporozoites will migrate to the salivary glands, then to a bat host during feeding.

Vertical transmission of Polychromophilus murinus does not take place in either bat fly puparia or bat pups. Rather, it is exclusively directly transmitted from the bat flies blood feeding.

=== Cell structure ===
Gametocytes are large round to oval-shaped with a maximal diameter of 6-8 μm. Mature gametocytes within the bat host will take up majority of the red blood cell space, leaving only the edge of the red blood cell visible. Pigmentation granules are of similar shape to mouse droppings and are of irregular size and amount, typically occurring in clusters. Like many genuses under Plasmodiidae, there are hemozoin pigment grains which are scattered within the cytoplasm. On average between 14 - 25 dark pigments are in the cytoplasm. Female macrogametocytes have a round and well-bordered nucleus in a dense cytoplasm, while male microgametocytes are more oval-shaped with a lighter colored cytoplasm, and a diffuse, random, ill-defined nucleus; a distingushing characteristic of male microgametocytes of P. murinus.

== Distribution ==
Polychromophilus murinus has a sporadic infection rate, meaning there are unsteady increases and flat trends across different years and seasons. The most notable infection rates studied were during July - August of 2010, with a period of increase over the summer season, but this trend did not continue the next year. P. murinus infections have been recorded across Europe, Asia, Madagascar, and Panama.

=== Geological prevalence ===
Polychromophilus murinus is geologically prevalent in Europe, Asia, Madagascar, and one recording in Panama. The parasite shows very little phylogeographical structure, due to its broad dispersal. Since there is a larger distribution in Europe of P. murinus, there are a far greater number of bats to have been infected in this geological range than compared to Asia, Madagascar, or Panama.

European countries recorded with infection: Belgium, Bulgaria, France, Georgia, Germany, Hungary, Italy, Luxembourg, Netherlands, Romania, Russia, Slovenia, Spain, Switzerland, Turkey, the United Kingdom, Ukraine.

Bat species recorded in Europe with P. murinus:

- Myotis bechsteinii
- Myotis blythii
- Myotis capaccinii
- Myotis crypticus
- Myotis daubentonii
- Myotis myotis
- Myotis nattereri
- Rhinolophus ferrumequinum
- Rhinolophus hipposideros
- Rhinolophus mehelyi

Bat fly species recorded in Europe with P. murinus:

- Basilia nana
- Basilia nattereri
- Nycteribia kolenatii
- Nycteribia pedicularia
- Nycteribia vexata
- Penicillidia dufourii

Asian countries recorded with infection : Cambodia, Thailand

Bat species recorded in Asia with P. murinus:

- Kerivoula hardwickii
- Myotis siligorensis
- Scotophilus kuhlii

Bat fly species recorded in Asia with P. murinus:

- Nycteribia kolenatii
- Nycteribia pedicularia
- Nycteribia vexata

Madagascar and Panama

In Madagascar, the recorded bat species that has been infected with P. murinus are Myotis goudoti and Scotophilus robustus, both infected by Nycteribiid flies. Within Panama, there one bat species recorded to have been infected; Myotis nigricans by a Nycteribiid fly.

== Susceptibility ==
As the bat hosts and bat fly vectors reproduce nearby each other in the roosts, there is a high level of exposure of Polychromophilus murinus, especially with the young bat pups, as the bat fly adults primarily target them. This continues the P. murinus life cycle establishing infection in newly emerging bat flies, but with targeting of young bat pups, there is an increasing tolerance over time to further infections. Observed by the absence of pathological symptoms in adults in conjunction with the parasites' ability to remain in bat populations throughout the year. The parasite easily remains in bat populations as bat flies are long-lived insects and capable of overwintering while maintaining a P. murinus infection. On this note, luckily, cross and co-infections between Polychromophilus sp. in the same bat host has not been recorded.

=== Biological prevalence ===
There is no observed difference in effect or prevalence between the sexes of bat hosts, but, the condition and age of the bat hosts seem to have a correlation with parasitemia. Adult bats had an increased rate of infection with increasing body condition, while juvenile bats had a strong negative relationship with body condition and parasitemia. Bat hosts with lower body conditions had higher parasitemia, meaning that juvenile bats hold a higher chance of parasitemia and a higher infection load than adult bats.

== Pathology ==
=== Effect / symptoms ===
The physiological effect of infection found to be caused by Polychromophilus murinus has only been found to be weight loss, with debate over fever, as bats are heterotherms. Since there is no asexual multiplication (erythrocytic schizogony) occurring in the bat host, the erythrocytes destroyed by P. murinus during an infection are lower compared to other malarial species. Meaning, the bat hosts do not experience anemia unless undergoing an extreme case of infection. Due, however, to the little research done in this area of pathology and P. murinus's appearances being ubiquitous, it is hard to state that the parasite is unknown if it is detrimental, beneficial, or neutral in its infection.

=== Polychromophilus murinus in relation to humans ===
Polychromophilus murinus is not zoonotic, and is not considered to have any effect on humans. There has been an attempt in studying P. murinus infection on humans by injecting infected bat blood into a human subject and while a fever developed, it is thought that it was due to contamination from the injection and surrounding pathogens.

=== Treatment ===
There is no known treatment for P. murinus.
