= Plasmodium basilisci =

Scientific classification
- Domain: Eukaryota
- Clade: Sar
- Clade: Alveolata
- Phylum: Apicomplexa
- Class: Aconoidasida
- Order: Haemospororida
- Family: Plasmodiidae
- Genus: Plasmodium
- Species: P. basilisci

Binomial name
- Plasmodium basilisci Pelaez & Perez, Reyes 1959

Species of single-celled organism

Plasmodium basilisci is a parasite of the genus Plasmodium subgenus Carinamoeba.

Like all Plasmodium species P. basilisci has both vertebrate and insect hosts. The vertebrate hosts for this parasite are reptiles.

== Discovery and description ==
The first description of Plasmodium basilisci was in 2 iguanids of the sp. Basiliscus family (Wiegman, 1828)

According to Palaez and Perez-Reyes:

Plasmodium basilisci has been described from 2 iguanids of the sp. Basiliscus vittatus Wiegman, 1828, obtained from the surrounding lands of Laguna Encantada, San Andres Tuxtla (Veracruz) Mexico. One of the Basiliscus was kept in the laboratory for 2 weeks, during which time the parasites were studied in several dry-fixed blood smears with Giemsa's stain. The parasite was discovered only in erythrocytes, usually occupied a polar position in the cytoplasm and did not cause distortion or hypertrophy of host cells. [The] attempts to establish the parasite by intra-peritoneal inoculations with blood in 2 spp. of uninfected lizards (2 Sceloporus teapensis and 6 S. mucronatus mucronatus) were unsuccessful.

According to Nancy L. Herban and G. Robert Coatney, the following observation was made by Donald J. Pletsch on two Iguana iguana rhinolpha on April 28, 1968 in San Salvador:

The youngest stage noted was 2 µm in diameter with a red nucleus on the margin of the blue-staining ring-shaped parasite. Older forms were 4-6 µm in length and 3 µm wide and irregular in shape. The parasite was located in a polar position in the host cell. The nuclear divisions in the developing schizonts were scattered about with no regular shape to the parasite. In later stages they arranged themselves to compactly in a double-fan configuration about a single mass of dark brown pigment. The number of merozoites ranged from six to nine with an average number of seven. The size of the more mature schizonts was 3 by 6 µm. The female gametocytes were elongate, measuring 5 by 10 µm. The nucleus was pale pink and the cytoplasm light blue. There were six to eight grains of reddish to brown pigment usually located at one end of the parasite. The male gametocyte measured 4-8 µm and was shaped irregularly. The nucleus was reddish-purple and the cytoplasm stained mauve with the dark pigments in granules of different sizes scattered throughout the cytoplasm. The host cell was not enlarged and no displacement of the nucleus was noted. This species infects mature cells only. The parasite occurs in a polar position in the cell. The host cell is not enlarged and the nucleus is not displaced.

Today, it is known to be infecting reptiles only.

== Distribution ==
This species occurs in Brazil, El Salvador and Honduras:

== Notes ==
- Cyril Garnham found that a P. tropiduri parasite discovered by Fonseca to be P. basilisci but with eight merozoites per schizont.: Brazil, 1952.
- Garnham described P. basilisci in the British Honduras in 1963.
- Perez-Reyez found P. basilisci Pelaez, Mexican P. basilisci, in the blood of two Iguana iguana in El Salvador, Honduras in 1959. This type of P. basilisci was slightly larger and differed in the number of merozoites. According to Graham it functioned by paraziting proerythrocytes containing more merozoites than those in erythrocytes with its schizonts.
- Gorgas Memorial Laboratory scientists detected Plasmodium basilisci in Basiliscus vittatus and Basiliscus plumbifrons: Panama, 1964.

== Hosts ==
This species infects the striped basilisk (Basiliscus vittatus), Basiliscus plumbifrons and Iguana iguana rhinolopha.
