= Plasmodium diploglossi =

Scientific classification
- Domain: Eukaryota
- Clade: Sar
- Clade: Alveolata
- Phylum: Apicomplexa
- Class: Aconoidasida
- Order: Haemospororida
- Family: Plasmodiidae
- Genus: Plasmodium
- Species: P. diploglossi

Binomial name
- Plasmodium diploglossi Aragio and Neiva, 1909

Species of single-celled organism

Plasmodium diploglossi is a parasite of the genus Plasmodium subgenus Sauramoeba. As in all Plasmodium species, P. diploglossi has both vertebrate and insect hosts. The vertebrate hosts for this parasite are reptiles.

== Taxonomy ==
The parasite was first described by Aragio and Neiva in 1909. It is the type species of the subgenus Sauramoeba.

== Description ==
Pigment does not occupy a distinct vacuole but may be clumped.

The large schizonts considerably enlarge the host erythrocyte and may completely encircle the host cell nucleus.

The mature gametocytes are broad.

Like the schizonts, the gametocytes may almost encircle the host cell nucleus.

A small cytoplasmic vacuole may be present in some gametocytes.

== Distribution ==
This species is found in eastern Panama.

== Hosts ==
This species infects the anguid lizard Diploglossus fasciatus and Mabuya mabouya.
