= Polychromophilus =

Scientific classification
- Domain: Eukaryota
- Clade: Sar
- Clade: Alveolata
- Phylum: Apicomplexa
- Class: Aconoidasida
- Order: Haemospororida
- Family: Plasmodiidae
- Genus: Polychromophilus

Species
- Polychromophilus adami Polychromophilus corradetti Polychromophilus deanei Polychromophilus fulvida Polychromophilus melanipherus Polychromophilus murinus

Genus of single-celled organisms

Polychromophilus is a genus of obligate intracellular eukaryotic parasites that infect bats from every continent except Antarctica. They are transmitted by bat flies, which act as an insect vector as well as the parasite’s site of sporogeny. Polychromophilus follows a fairly typical Haemospororidian lifecycle, with gametocytes and gametes restricted to the bloodstream of the host and meronts infecting organs – most notably the lungs and the liver. The type species is Polychromophilus melanipherus, and was described by Dionisi in 1898.

== Taxonomy ==
Polychromophilus was first described by Dionisi in 1898, who also differentiated between the first two species, Polychromophilus murinus and Polychromophilus melanipherus. Both of these original species were named after their primary hosts – Vespertilio murinus and Miniopterus schreibersi respectively.

In 1906, Schingareff managed to observe and describe merozoites within macrophages of Myotis daubentoni and Miniopterus schreibersi and suspected that nycteribiid flies acted as insect vectors. This was not evidenced until Corradetti discovered sporozoites within such flies in 1936, and was further supported by later research.

The genus was divided into two subgenera — Polychromophilus and Bioccala but the subgenus Bioccala was raised to genus status in 1984.

This genus along with Haemoproteus and Hepatocystis appears to be a sister clade to Plasmodium. It appears to have evolved from the avian/saurian clade of Plasmodium.

== Life cycle ==
Polychromophilus sporozoites remain within the salivary glands of their insect vectors until a blood meal is taken. The sporozoites enter the primary host’s bloodstream and infect erythrocytes, inside of which the parasite develops into gametocytes. The gametocytes then proceed to sexually reproduce via gametogony, involving the exflagellation of the parasite forming numerous microgametes and macrogametes.

The microgametes and macrogametes remain within the blood until they are taken in by an insect vector during another blood meal. The gametes then fuse in pairs within the gut of the insect, and the fertilised macrogamete develops into an ookinete. This then enters the body of the insect vector and further develops into an oocyst between the epithelial cells and basement membrane of the midgut.

The oocyst then begins to divide into numerous sporozoites which remain within the thick oocyst capsule. Upon maturation, the oocyst bursts releasing the sporozoites into the insect vector, where they migrate toward the salivary gland ready to continue their cycle. The bursting of the oocysts leaves behind large residual bodies within the insect vector, which do not continue sporozoite development.

Merogony of the parasite, although less well understood, has been observed to occur in a variety of organs and cell types of the primary bat host. Large bodies have been discovered in organs including the spleen and lungs, while small meronts have been found to develop within the Kupffer cells of the liver. The meronts are often transported around the body by macrophages in the blood.

== Hosts and habitat ==
The genus Polychromophilus infects a diverse range of bats, and is present on every continent inhabited by their hosts. The type species, Polychromophilus melanipherus, was first observed in the Roman Campagna within the type host Miniopterus schreibersi. The presence of the parasite has since been discovered in numerous locations worldwide, including Israel, Australia, the Congo, Ethiopia, Brazil, and North America.

The insect vectors of Polychromophilus comprise entirely of bat flies of three different genera – Basilia, Nycteribia, and Penicillidia. No other insects are known to carry the parasite.

== Host records ==
- P. adami — least long fingered bat (Miniopterus minor minor)
- P. corradetti — greater long fingered bat (Miniopterus inflatus)
- P. melanipherus — little cave eptesicus (Eptesicus pumilus), greater wart nosed horseshoe bat (Hipposideros semoni), eastern long eared bat (Nyctophilus bifax), (Miniopterus blepotis), common bent wing bat (Miniopterus schreibersii), (Vespadelus pumilis)
- P. murinus — little bent wing bat (Miniopterus australis), Daubenton's bat (Myotis daubentoni), greater mouse-eared bat (Myotis myotis), Sundevall's roundleaf bat (Hipposideros caffer), southeastern myotis (Myotis austroriparius), Bechstein's bat (Myotis bechsteini), Adam's horseshoe bat (Rhinolophus adami), Geoffroy's horseshoe bat (Rhinolophus clivosus), Lander's horseshoe bat (Rhinolophus landeri)

== Description ==
Sporozoites are elongated and straight or slightly curved in shape, and not particularly motile. When prepared with a Giemsa-stain, their oval and slightly unconventional nucleus becomes visible. Their pellicle comprises a thin outer membrane separated from a double inner membrane, underneath which lies 21 subpellicular microtubules evenly spaced around the periphery. Many micronemes are present in the anterior tip of the sporozoite, and a single mitochondrion containing tubular cristae lies behind the nucleus.

Gametocytes tend to take up almost the entirety of their host erythrocyte, and hence are covered by a thin layer of erythrocyte. They are contained within a trilaminar pellicle, consisting of a parasitophorous vacuole membrane, the gametocyte plasmalemma, and an inner double membrane. Multiple intracellular organelles are visible within the gametocytes, including mitochondria with tubular cristae, a Golgi apparatus, micronemes, primary lysosomes, and a microtubule organising centre comprising two centrioles. No visible cytosome is present. Microgametocytes stain pink with Giemsa, and contain a large diffuse nucleus lacking a visible nucleolus. Macrogametocytes, on the other hand, stain blue-purple due to a higher number of ribosomes within the cytoplasm and contain a small distinct nucleus with a clearly visible nucleolus. The gametocytes are known to doubly infect the same erythrocyte, a feature considered characteristic of some species.

Oocysts are covered by an amorphous capsule comprising an inner granular layer and an outer lighter layer. The capsule is often observed to form invaginations into the oocyst cytoplasm. The oocyst generally contains multiple cristate mitochondria, and mature oocysts are packed with sporozoites.
