= Plasmodium tomodoni =

Scientific classification
- Domain: Eukaryota
- Clade: Sar
- Clade: Alveolata
- Phylum: Apicomplexa
- Class: Aconoidasida
- Order: Haemospororida
- Family: Plasmodiidae
- Genus: Plasmodium
- Species: P. tomodoni

Binomial name
- Plasmodium tomodoni Pessoa and Fleury, 1968

Species of single-celled organism

Plasmodium tomodoni is a parasite of the genus Plasmodium. As in all Plasmodium species, P. tomodoni has both vertebrate and insect hosts. The vertebrate hosts for this parasite are reptiles.

== Taxonomy ==
The parasite was first described by Pessoa and Fleury in 1968.

== Distribution ==
This species is found in Brazil.

== Hosts ==
This species infects snakes. The other two species infecting snakes are Plasmodium pessoai and Plasmodium wenyoni.

The original host this species was described from was a Tomodon dorsatus from Brazil.
