= Plasmodium vastator =

Scientific classification
- Domain: Eukaryota
- Clade: Sar
- Clade: Alveolata
- Phylum: Apicomplexa
- Class: Aconoidasida
- Order: Haemospororida
- Family: Plasmodiidae
- Genus: Plasmodium
- Species: P. vastator

Binomial name
- Plasmodium vastator Telford, 1995

Species of single-celled organism

Plasmodium vastator is a species of apicomplexan parasite in the family Plasmodiidae. The vertebrate hosts for this parasite are reptiles.

== Description ==
The parasite was first described by Telford in 1995. The schizonts give rise to 4 - 8 merozoites. The gametocytes are elongated.

== Distribution ==
This species occurs in the Philippines.

== Hosts ==
This species infects the agamid lizard Draco volans.
