= Nycteria =

Scientific classification
- Domain: Eukaryota
- Supergroup: Alveolata
- Phylum: Apicomplexa
- Class: Aconoidasida
- Order: Haemospororida
- Family: Plasmodiidae
- Genus: Nycteria

Species
- Nycteria brucechwatti; Nycteria congolensis; Nycteria erardi; Nycteria gabonensis; Nycteria houini; Nycteria krampitzi; Nycteria medusiformis

Genus of single-celled organisms

Nycteria is a genus of protozoan parasites that belong to the phylum Apicomplexa. It is composed of vector-borne haemosporidian parasites that infect a wide range of mammals such as primates, rodents and bats. Its vertebrate hosts are bats. First described by Garnham and Heisch in 1953, Nycteria is mostly found in bat species where it feeds off the blood of their hosts and causes disease. Within the host, Nycteria develops into peculiar lobulated schizonts in parenchyma cells of the liver, similarly to the stages of Plasmodium falciparum in the liver. The vector of Nycteria has been hard to acquire and identify. Because of this, the life cycle of Nycteria still remains unknown and understudied. It has been suggested that this vector could be an arthropod other than a mosquito or the vector of most haemosporidian parasites.

== Etymology ==
The word Nycteris is derived from the Greek word "nykteros", also "bat". Nycteris is a bat genus in the family Nycteridae, and the genus name Nycteria was given to underline the relationship between these bats and their parasites.

== Historical background ==
Nycteria was first described by Garnham and Heisch in 1953, where they discovered a new form of blood parasite (Nycteria medusiformis) in Kenya responsible for malaria in the Egyptian tomb bat Taphozous perforates.

== Description ==
To date, Nycteria has been characterized based on parasite blood and tissue stages, which are limited to gametocytes. The earliest morphological description of Nycteria was from discovery of Nycteria medusiformis in the insectivorous bat Taphozous perforates, where gametocytes of the species were found in the blood of their host and asexual development of the parasite was confined to the parenchyma cells of the liver. Members of the genus Nycteria lack erythrocytic schizogony, which is a specific replication phase inside red blood cells responsible for causing malaria. Instead, they develop into peculiar lobulated schizonts of less than 100 μm in size, similar to Plasmodium falciparum stages in the liver. They consist of characteristic filaments that protrude from the surface of the parasitized blood cells; however, these filaments were not considered to be cellular structures of the parasite itself, but as degenerative formations of the erythrocyte. The size (numerical value unknown) of these gametocytes were also described. Round male gametocytes of Nycteria were also found to rarely occupy the host erythrocyte completely.

A recent study also showed similar morphological characteristics of the gametocytes in N. medusiformis They found mature gametocytes completely filled the red blood cells of the infected species and were slightly enlarged by 2 μm more than uninfected red blood cells. Filaments expressed on the surface of infected erythrocytes were also found, as originally described, and became fewer and shorter as the gametocytes matured and sometimes disappeared at later stages. Fine pigment grains were found scattered irregularly throughout the cytoplasm and highly chromophilic macrogametocytes had a dark blue-purple color containing a small, condensed nuclei. Microgametocytes had a pale, pink color containing a small, central condensation of chromatin possibly reminiscent of a rosette – groupings of cells usually found in tumors.

Another species of the genus, N. grandis, also showed similar morphological structure of the Nycteria gametocyte to N. medusiformis, but lack highly characteristic filaments as seen in N. medusiformis. Therefore, the morphotype of N. grandis differed from N. medusiformis by size, nucleus of the microgametocytes, and pigment features. Unfortunately, insufficient data on Nycteria gametocytes in N. grandis does not allow a full description of the species. Due to lack understanding of the vector of Nycteria, details of its pre-erythrocytic cycle remain unknown.

== Habitat and ecology ==
Nycteria is prevalent in African bats, feeding on the blood of their hosts. Although the identity of the vector in Nycteria still remains unresolved during their parasitic life cycle, it has been suggested that it could possibly be an arthropod other than a mosquito. It is also hypothesized that the vectors of Nycteria belong to the family Diptera, since most haemosporidian parasites are transmitted through blood-sucking dipteran insects.

== Future research ==
To date, studies of haemosporidian parasites are highly neglected. Further research on the genus might offer previous unrecognized insights into the evolution of human pathogens, as well into diverse parasite strategies to achieve stable transmission to host populations.

== Hosts ==
- N. brucechwatti — Intermediate roundleaf bat (Hipposideros larvatus)
- N. medusiformis — Egyptian slit-faced bat (Nycteris thebaica capensis), Egyptian tomb bat (Taphozous perforatus)
