= Asiamoeba =

Scientific classification
- Domain: Eukaryota
- Clade: Sar
- Clade: Alveolata
- Phylum: Apicomplexa
- Class: Aconoidasida
- Order: Haemospororida
- Family: Plasmodiidae
- Genus: Plasmodium
- Subgenus: Asiamoeba; Telford, 1988

Species
- See text

Subgenus of single-celled organisms

Asiamoeba is a subgenus of the genus Plasmodium - all of which are parasitic unicellular eukaryotes. The subgenus was created by Telford in 1988. Species in this subgenus infect lizards.

== Diagnostic features ==
Species in the subgenus Asiamoeba have the following characteristics:

The schizonts and gametocytes are greatly disparate in size (4 to 15 times).

== Species in this subgenus ==
- Plasmodium draconis
- Plasmodium lionatum
- Plasmodium vastator
