= Plasmodium aurulentum =

Scientific classification
- Domain: Eukaryota
- Clade: Sar
- Clade: Alveolata
- Phylum: Apicomplexa
- Class: Aconoidasida
- Order: Haemospororida
- Family: Plasmodiidae
- Genus: Plasmodium
- Species: P. aurulentum

Binomial name
- Plasmodium aurulentum Telford, 1971

Species of single-celled organism

Plasmodium anasum is a species of the genus Plasmodium.

Like all species in this genus it has both vertebrate and insect hosts. The vertebrate host are reptiles.

== Description ==
This species was described by Telford in 1971.

The schizonts give rise to 8 to 30 merozoites.

The gametocytes are round to oval.

== Geographical location ==
This species is found in Venezuela and Panama.

== Clinical features and pathological effects ==
The only known host is the gecko Thecadactylus rapicaudus.
