= Biguetiella =

Scientific classification
- Domain: Eukaryota
- Clade: Diaphoretickes
- Clade: SAR
- Clade: Alveolata
- Phylum: Apicomplexa
- Class: Aconoidasida
- Order: Haemospororida
- Family: Plasmodiidae
- Genus: Biguetiella; Landau et al., 1984

Species
- Biguetiella minuta

Genus of single-celled organisms

Biguetiella is a genus in the phylum Apicomplexa. The type species of this genus is Biguetiella minuta.

== Taxonomy ==
The genus was described by Landau et al. in 1984.

== Description ==
Biguetiella has small intra-hepatocytic schizonts (< 15 micrometres).

== Hosts ==
The only known host of these parasites is the intermediate roundleaf bat (Hipposideros larvatus).

== Distribution ==
These parasites are found in Thailand.
