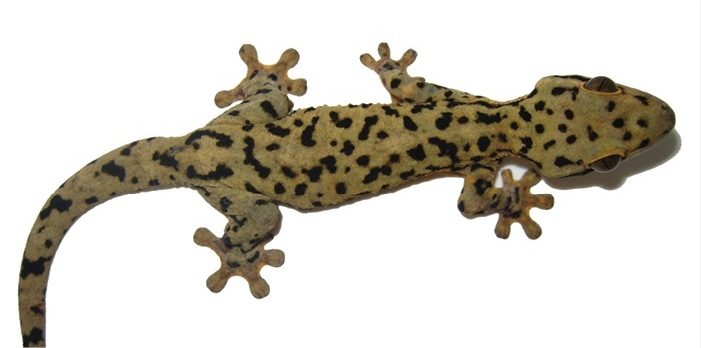

Conservation status
- Data Deficient (IUCN 3.1)

Scientific classification
- Kingdom: Animalia
- Phylum: Chordata
- Class: Reptilia
- Order: Squamata
- Suborder: Gekkota
- Family: Phyllodactylidae
- Genus: Thecadactylus
- Species: T. oskrobapreinorum

Binomial name
- Thecadactylus oskrobapreinorum Köhler & Vesely, 2011

= Thecadactylus oskrobapreinorum =

Species of lizard

Thecadactylus oskrobapreinorum is a species of gecko. It was first described in 2011 from Sint Maarten in the Lesser Antilles. Prior to the species being described, it was thought that the only species of turnip-tailed gecko present in the Lesser Antilles was Thecadactylus rapicauda. The characteristics of the spotted pattern on the back of Thecadactylus oskrobapreinorum allows it to be distinguished from the other members of Thecadactylus.

== Taxonomy ==
The species was first described in a 2011 paper by Gunther Köhler and Milan Vesely, who gave it the specific name oskrobapreinorum in honour of German herpetologists Maciej Oskroba and Stephan Prein, who first studied the gecko.

== Description ==
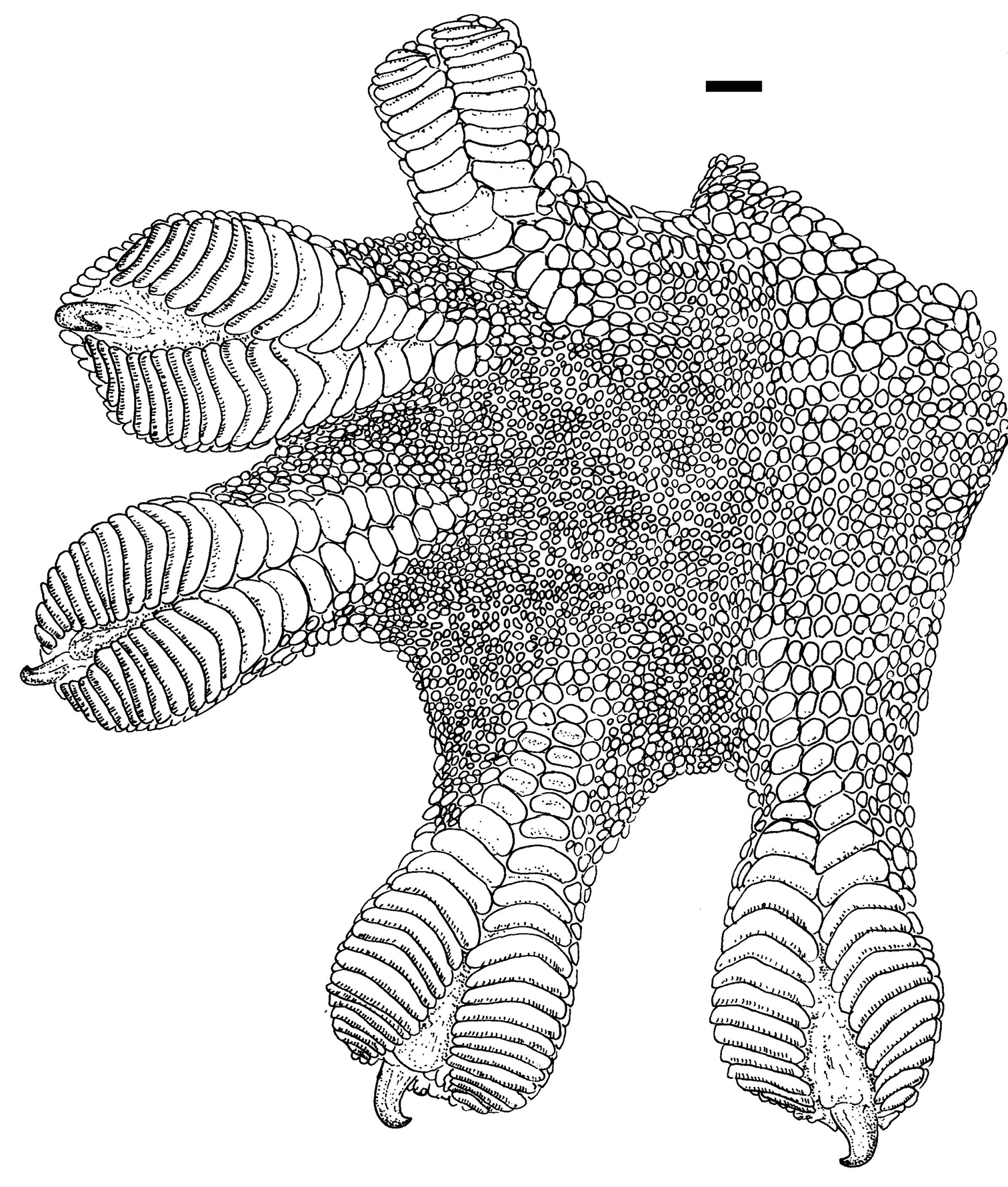
Right hind foot of holotype

The holotype of the species has a snout-to-vent length of 95.5 millimetres (3.76 in) and a tail length of 75 mm (3.0 in). The largest specimen examined by Köhler and Vesely had a snout-to-vent length of 99 mm (3.9 in). It is distinguished from other members of the genus by fact that the black markings on its back are irregular yet sharply delineated from the nearly patternless surrounding skin, which is of a pale greyish-yellow or greyish-olive colouration. It has adhesive toe-pads on its feet. A 2018 study examined the osteological characters of a Thecadactylus oskrobapreinorum specimen and found them to be the same as those of Thecadactylus rapicauda.

== Distribution and habitat ==
Thecadactylus oskrobapreinorum is known only from the Caribbean island of Saint Martin. The holotype came from Sint Maarten, part of the Kingdom of the Netherlands, but the gecko is also known from the French overseas Collectivity of Saint Martin. The gecko is found on the lower parts of the trunks of trees in forests and near forest edges. It is active at night.
