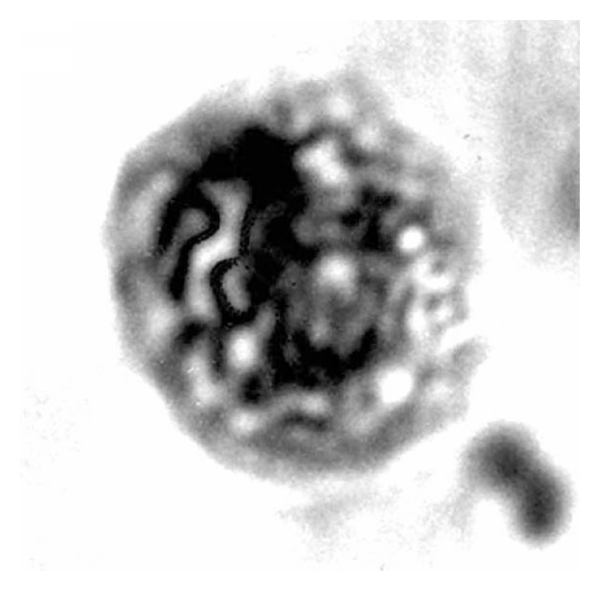
- Paleohaemoproteus burmacis oocyst

Scientific classification
- Domain: Eukaryota
- Clade: Sar
- Clade: Alveolata
- Phylum: Apicomplexa
- Class: Aconoidasida
- Order: Haemospororida
- Family: Plasmodiidae
- Genus: †Paleohaemoproteus
- Species: †P. burmacis

Binomial name
- †Paleohaemoproteus burmacis Poinar & Telford, 2005

= Paleohaemoproteus =

Paleohaemoproteus Temporal range: Late Albian - Early Cenomanian 110-99mya

Extinct genus of flies

Paleohaemoproteus is an extinct genus of Haemoproteus like organisms.

The type species and only known example is that of an isolate found in the abdominal cavity of a female biting midge trapped 100 million years ago in amber found in Myanmar.

The amber has been dated to the Middle Cretaceous.
