= Plasmodium juxtanucleare =

Scientific classification
- Domain: Eukaryota
- Clade: Sar
- Clade: Alveolata
- Phylum: Apicomplexa
- Class: Aconoidasida
- Order: Haemospororida
- Family: Plasmodiidae
- Genus: Plasmodium
- Species: P. juxtanucleare

Binomial name
- Plasmodium juxtanucleare Versiani and Gomes, 1941

Species of single-celled organism

Plasmodium juxtanucleare is a species of parasite in the family Plasmodiidae. The vertebrate hosts for this parasite are birds.

== Description ==
This species was first described in 1941 by Versiani and Gomes. The subgenus is named after Professor Gordon F. Bennett.

Parasite densities tend to be low (0.1–1% infected erythrocytes). Multiple infections of the same erythrocyte may occur.

The trophozoites have scanty cytoplasm and are irregular in shape. When fully grown they may be round, oval or irregular. They adhere closely to the nucleus and have 1-2 pigment granules. While a vacuole may be present there is no ring form unlike that of other species.

The trophozoites produce two to six merozoites per erythrocyte. The merozoites have scanty cytoplasm and do not exceed the size of the nucleus when fully developed.

The schizonts are small and always found juxtaposed to the erythrocyte nucleus.

The gametocytes resemble those of Plasmodium relictum and may displace the nucleus. They are of variable shape:oval, round, elongated or even irregular. They do not exceed the size of the nucleus.

Perhaps the most characteristic feature of this genus is the formation of pedunculated oocyts in the mosquito midgut.

== Distribution ==
This species is found in a number of countries including Brasil, India, Indonesia, Japan, Philippines, Malaysia, Mexico, South Africa, Sri Lanka, Taiwan, Tanzania and Uruguay. It is thought that this species probably originated in South East Asia but this requires confirmation.

== Clinical features and host pathology ==
The disease caused by this parasite is similar to that caused by Leucocytozoon caulleryi.

P. juxtanucleare is one of the causes of chicken malaria. Clinical findings associated with high parasitemia are anemia, diarrhea and weight loss that may lead to death. Body temperature is not elevated. Increases in the thrombocyte number and total leukocyte and basophil count have been reported.

The course of the parasitemia showed low levels initially and reaching a peak after 15 days; trophozoites were the most commonly observed form, followed by schizonts (first detected on day 12) and gametocytes (first seen on day 27). The typical distribution after the gametocytes have appeared is trophozoites (80%) schizonts (17%) and gametocytes (3%).

P. juxtanucleare also infects black-footed penguins. Five fatal cases were reported in a Sounth African zoo. Laboratory findings included parasitemia, splenomegaly, pulmonary oedema and schizonts in the reticuloendothelial system.

This species infects the Chinese bamboo partridge, white eared-pheasant, Malayan jungle fowl (Gallus gallus spadiceus), Sri Lankan junglefowl, grey-winged francolin, crested francolin, wild turkey and the Indian peafowl.

== Known vectors ==
Culex annulus
Culex gelidus
Culex molestus Forskal
Culex pipiens fatigens
Culex pipiens pallus
Culex pseudovishnui
Culex saltanensis Dyar 1928
Culex (Culex) sitiens Wiedmann
Culex tritaeniorhynchus

Mansonia crassipes

== Bennettinia ==
Bennettinia is a subgenus of Plasmodium created in 1997 by Valkiunas. in honour of the parasitologist Gordon F. Bennett. Plasmodium juxtanucleare is the sole species in this subgenus.
