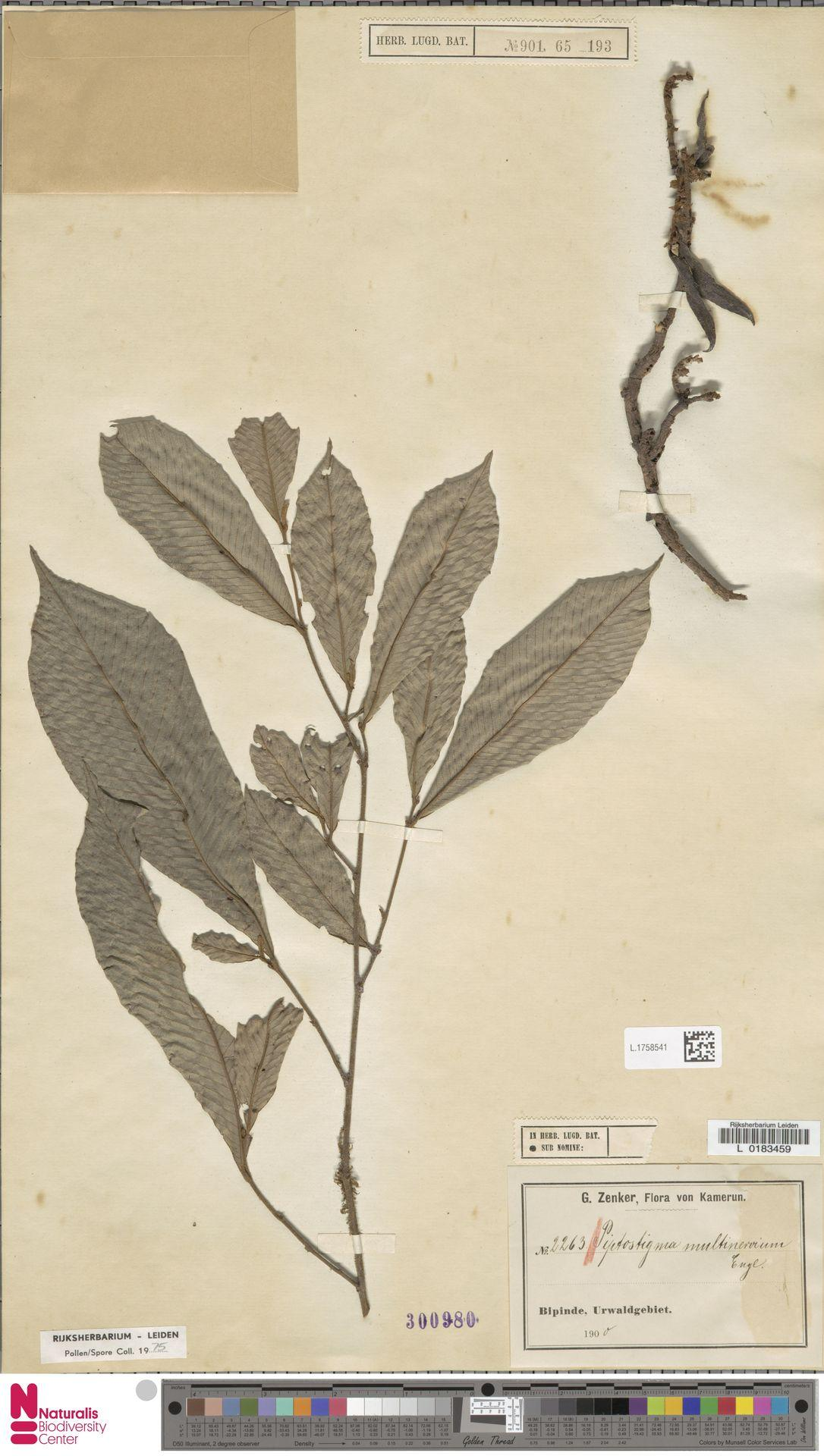
- Piptostigma multinervium

Scientific classification
- Kingdom: Plantae
- Clade: Embryophytes
- Clade: Tracheophytes
- Clade: Spermatophytes
- Clade: Angiosperms
- Clade: Magnoliids
- Order: Magnoliales
- Family: Annonaceae
- Tribe: Piptostigmateae
- Genus: Piptostigma; Oliv.

= Piptostigma =

Genus of flowering plants

Piptostigma is a genus of flowering plants in family Annonaceae. It contains 13 species native to western and central tropical Africa.

== Species ==
13 species are accepted.

- Piptostigma calophyllum Mildbr. & Diels
- Piptostigma fugax A.Chev. ex Hutch. & Dalziel
- Piptostigma glabrescens Oliv.
- Piptostigma goslineanum Ghogue, Sonké & Couvreur
- Piptostigma longepilosum Engl.
- Piptostigma macranthum Mildbr. & Diels
- Piptostigma macrophyllum Ghogue, Sonké & Couvreur
- Piptostigma mayndongtsaeanum Ghogue, Sonké & Couvreur
- Piptostigma mortehanii De Wild.
- Piptostigma multinervium Engl. & Diels
- Piptostigma oyemense Pellegr.
- Piptostigma pilosum Oliv.
- Piptostigma submontanum Ghogue, Sonké & Couvreur
