= Sauramoeba =

Scientific classification
- Domain: Eukaryota
- Clade: Diaphoretickes
- Clade: SAR
- Clade: Alveolata
- Phylum: Apicomplexa
- Class: Aconoidasida
- Order: Haemospororida
- Family: Plasmodiidae
- Genus: Plasmodium
- Subgenus: Sauramoeba; Garnham, 1966

Subgenus of single-celled organisms

Sauramoeba is a subgenus of the genus Plasmodium, all of which are parasitic eukaryotes. The subgenus was created in 1966 by Garnham. Species in this subgenus infect reptiles.

== Description ==
The original criterion for inclusion in this genus was the presence of large schizonts giving rise to 12 or more merozoites. The criteria were subsequently revised by Telford in 1988. The type species of this subgenus is Plasmodium diploglossi.

Species in the subgenus Sauramoeba have the following characteristics:

Large schizonts giving rise to 12 or more merozoites

The gametocytes like the schizonts are large.

== Species ==
- Plasmodium achiotense
- Plasmodium aeuminatum
- Plasmodium agamae
- Plasmodium beltrani
- Plasmodium brumpti
- Plasmodium caucasica
- Plasmodium diploglossi
- Plasmodium giganteum
- Plasmodium guyannense
- Plasmodium heischi
- Plasmodium josephinae
- Plasmodium kentropyxi
- Plasmodium marginatum
- Plasmodium michikoa
- Plasmodium pelaezi
- Plasmodium robinsoni
