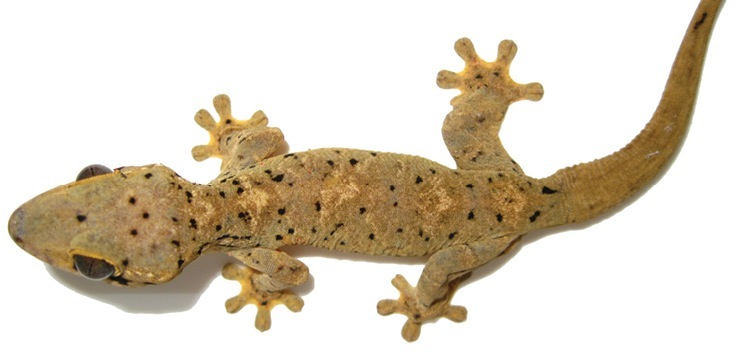
- Thecadactylus oskrobapreinorum

Scientific classification
- Kingdom: Animalia
- Phylum: Chordata
- Class: Reptilia
- Order: Squamata
- Suborder: Gekkota
- Family: Phyllodactylidae
- Genus: Thecadactylus; Goldfuss, 1820

Species
- 3, see text

= Thecadactylus =

Genus of lizards

Thecadactylus is a gekko genus from the tropical Americas. They are known as the turnip-tailed geckos. The genus belongs to the gecko family Phyllodactylidae. Until 2007, it was believed to be monotypic, with T. rapicauda the sole species. Then however, the population from upstream southern Amazon basin was discovered to be very distinct and was named a new species, T. solimoensis. A third species was described in 2011.

- Thecadactylus oskrobapreinorum Köhler & Vesely, 2011
- Thecadactylus rapicauda Houttuyn, 1782 – turniptail gecko
- Thecadactylus solimoensis Bergmann & Russell, 2007
