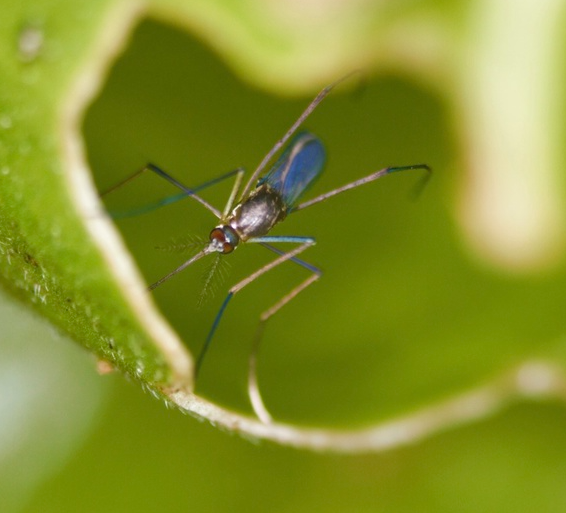
- W. smithii

Scientific classification
- Kingdom: Animalia
- Phylum: Arthropoda
- Clade: Pancrustacea
- Class: Insecta
- Order: Diptera
- Family: Culicidae
- Subfamily: Culicinae
- Tribe: Sabethini
- Genus: Wyeomyia; F. V. Theobald, 1901

Type species
- Wyeomyia grayii F. V. Theobald, 1901

= Wyeomyia =

Genus of flies

Wyeomyia is a genus of mosquitoes first described in 1901 by Frederick Vincent Theobald. The genus's 140 species can be difficult to characterize because of their diversity and the need for additional taxonomic work to further delineate them. Adults resemble genus Limatus and Sabethes mosquitoes more closely than other genera in the New World tribe Sabethini, but differ by their scutal scales ranging in color from a relatively dull bronzy with a slight metallic sheen in most species, to a metallic gold. There are other distinguishing characters as well.

== Distribution ==
Wyeomyia mosquitoes are predominantly neotropical, ranging across the Caribbean into Florida, with one species occurring in eastern North America.

== Ecology ==
Most Wyeomyia mosquitoes are forest-inhabiting, preferring damp environments. Larvae develop in small collections of water in bromeliads and aroids, flower bracts, broken bamboo and bamboo stumps, tree holes, pitcher plants, and sometimes man-made containers. They feed on organic matter in the water, including decomposing carcasses of insects and spiders. Some species obtain oxygen directly from the water, rarely, if ever, surfacing.

Adults are active during the day, usually near larval habitats. Some species are found at characteristic elevations in the forest canopy, with others appearing to be restricted to ground level.

Most Wyeomyia species will take blood meals, and females readily feed on humans who enter their habitat. Although Ilhéus, Venezuelan equine encephalitis and Maguari viruses have been isolated from Wyeomyia mosquitoes, they are not known to transmit a disease agent to humans.

== Species ==
The following species and subgenera are recognised:

=== Subgenus (Wyeomyia) ===
- Wyeomyia abebela Dyar and Knab, 1908
- Wyeomyia ablechra Dyar and Knab, 1908
- Wyeomyia adelpha Dyar and Knab, 1906
- Wyeomyia arthrostigma (Lutz, 1905)
- Wyeomyia atrata Belkin, Heinemann and Page, 1970
- Wyeomyia bahama Dyar and Knab, 1906
- Wyeomyia caracula Dyar and Nuñez Tovar, 1928
- Wyeomyia celaenocephala Dyar and Knab, 1906
- Wyeomyia charmion Dyar, 1928
- Wyeomyia corona Belkin, Heinemann and Page, 1970
- Wyeomyia downsi Lane, 1945
- Wyeomyia florestan Dyar, 1925
- Wyeomyia gaudians Dyar and Nuñez Tovar, 1927
- Wyeomyia gausapata Dyar and Nuñez Tovar, 1927
- Wyeomyia grayii Theobald, 1901
- Wyeomyia guatemala Dyar and Knab, 1906
- Wyeomyia hemisagnosta Dyar and Knab, 1906
- Wyeomyia hirsuta (Hill and Hill, 1946)
- Wyeomyia juxtahirsuta Belkin, Heinemann and Page, 1970
- Wyeomyia labesba Howard, Dyar and Knab, 1913
- Wyeomyia luna Belkin, Heinemann and Page, 1970
- Wyeomyia medioalbipes Lutz, 1904
- Wyeomyia melanopus Dyar, 1919
- Wyeomyia mitchellii (Theobald, 1905)
- Wyeomyia nigritubus Galindo, Carpenter and Trapido, 1951
- Wyeomyia pertinans (Williston, 1896)
- Wyeomyia pseudorobusta Pajot and Fauran, 1975
- Wyeomyia robusta Senevet and Abonnenc, 1939
- Wyeomyia scotinomus (Dyar and Knab, 1907)
- Wyeomyia simmsi (Dyar and Knab, 1908)
- Wyeomyia smithii (Coquillett, 1901) - pitcherplant mosquito, moustique de la sarracénie
- Wyeomyia sororcula Dyar and Knab, 1906
- Wyeomyia stellata Belkin, Heinemann and Page, 1970
- Wyeomyia stonei Vargas and Martínez Palacios, 1953
- Wyeomyia vanduzeei Dyar and Knab, 1906

=== Subgenus (Antunesmyia) ===
- Wyeomyia alani Lane and Cerqueira, 1957
- Wyeomyia colombiana Lane, 1945
- Wyeomyia flavifacies Edwards, 1922

=== Subgenus (Caenomyiella) ===
- Wyeomyia fernandezyepezi (Cova García, Sutil Oramas and Pulido, 1974)

=== Subgenus (Cruzmyia) ===
Here is the list with the Wikipedia syntax added:

- Wyeomyia dyari Lane and Cerqueira, 1942
- Wyeomyia forattinii Clastrier, 1974
- Wyeomyia kummi Lane and Cerqueira, 1942
- Wyeomyia mattinglyi Lane, 1953

=== Subgenus (Decamyia) ===
Here is the list with the Wikipedia syntax added:

- Wyeomyia felicia (Dyar and Nuñez Tovar, 1927)
- Wyeomyia pseudopecten Dyar and Knab, 1906
- Wyeomyia ulocoma (Theobald, 1903)

=== Subgenus (Dendromyia) ===
- Wyeomyia complosa (Dyar, 1928)
- Wyeomyia jocosa (Dyar and Knab, 1908)
- Wyeomyia luteoventralis Theobald, 1901
- Wyeomyia testei Senevet and Abonnenc, 1939
- Wyeomyia trifurcata Clastrier, 1973
- Wyeomyia ypsipola Dyar, 1922

=== Subgenus (Dodecamyia) ===
- Wyeomyia aphobema Dyar, 1918

=== Subgenus (Exallomyia) ===
- Wyeomyia arborea Galindo, Carpenter and Trapido, 1951
- Wyeomyia carrilloi (Sutil Oramas and Pulido, 1978)
- Wyeomyia tarsata Lane and Cerqueira, 1942

=== Subgenus (Hystatomyia) ===
- Wyeomyia autocratica Dyar and Knab, 1906
- Wyeomyia baltae Porter, 2009
- Wyeomyia chocoensis Porter and Wolff, 2004
- Wyeomyia circumcincta Dyar and Knab, 1907
- Wyeomyia coenonus Howard, Dyar and Knab, 1913
- Wyeomyia esmeraldasi (Leví-Castillo, 1955)
- Wyeomyia intonca Dyar and Knab, 1910
- Wyeomyia lamellata (Bonne-Wepster and Bonne, 1920)
- Wyeomyia lopezii Coval García, Sutil and Pulido, 1974

=== Subgenus (Menolepis) ===
- Wyeomyia leucostigma Lutz in Bourroul, 1904

=== Subgenus (Miamyia) ===
- Wyeomyia codiocampa Dyar and Knab, 1907
- Wyeomyia hosautos Dyar and Knab, 1907
- Wyeomyia limai Lane and Cerqueira, 1942
- Wyeomyia lutzi (da Costa Lima, 1930)

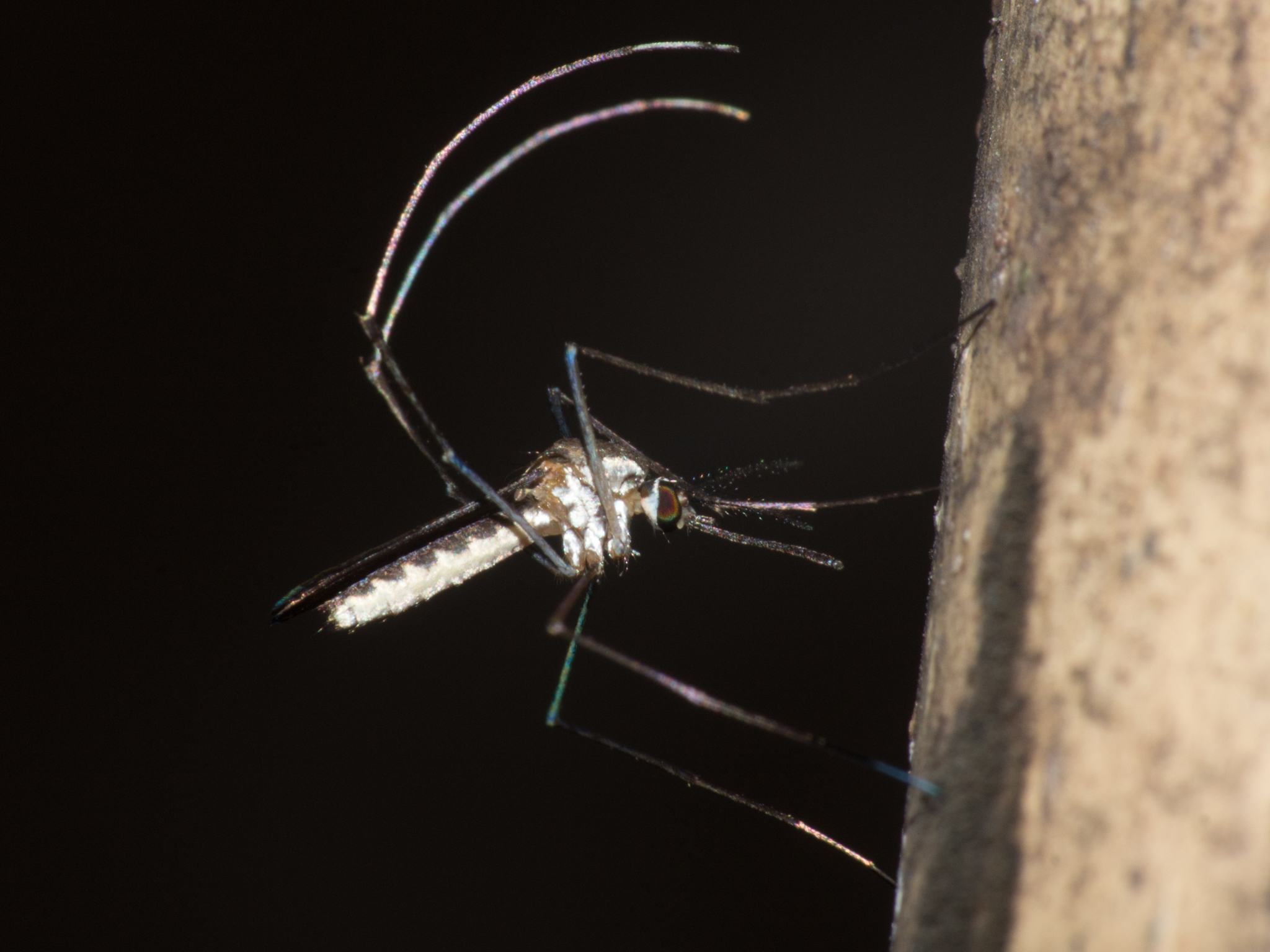
W. lutzi

- Wyeomyia oblita (Lutz in Bourroul, 1904)
- Wyeomyia sabethea Lane and Cerqueira, 1942
- Wyeomyia serrata (Lutz, 1905)

=== Subgenus (Nunezia) ===
- Wyeomyia bicornis (Root, 1928)
- Wyeomyia lateralis Petrocchi, 1927
- Wyeomyia paucartamboensis Porter, 2014

=== Subgenus (Phoniomyia) ===
- Wyeomyia antunesi Lane and Guimarães, 1937
- Wyeomyia bonnei (Lane and Cerqueira, 1942)
- Wyeomyia davisi (Lane and Cerqueira, 1942)
- Wyeomyia deanei (Lourenço-de-Oliveira, 1983)
- Wyeomyia diabolica (Lane and Forattini, 1952)
- Wyeomyia edwardsi (Lane and Cerqueira, 1942)
- Wyeomyia flabellata (Lane and Cerqueira, 1942)
- Wyeomyia fuscipes Edwards, 1922
- Wyeomyia galvaoi (Corrêa and Ramalho, 1956)
- Wyeomyia incaudata Root, 1928
- Wyeomyia lassalli (Bonne-Wepster and Bonne, 1921)
- Wyeomyia longirostris Theobald, 1901
- Wyeomyia lopesi (Corrêa and Ramalho, 1956)
- Wyeomyia muehlensi Petrocchi in Shannon and Del Ponte, 1927
- Wyeomyia pallidoventer (Theobald, 1907)
- Wyeomyia palmata (Lane and Cerqueira, 1942)
- Wyeomyia pilicauda Root in Dyar, 1928
- Wyeomyia quasilongirostris (Theobald, 1907)
- Wyeomyia splendida Bonne-Wepster and Bonne, 1919
- Wyeomyia theobaldi (Lane and Cerqueira, 1942)
- Wyeomyia trinidadensis Theobald, 1901
- Wyeomyia tripartita (Bonne-Wepster and Bonne, 1921)

=== Subgenus (Prosopolepis) ===
- Wyeomyia confusa (Lutz, 1905)

=== Subgenus (Spilonympha) ===
- Wyeomyia airosai Lane and Cerqueira, 1942
- Wyeomyia aningae Motta and Lourenço-de-Oliveira, 2005
- Wyeomyia bourrouli (Lutz, 1905)
- Wyeomyia finlayi Lane and Cerqueira, 1942
- Wyeomyia forcipenis Lourenço-de-Oliveira and da Silva, 1985
- Wyeomyia howardi Lane and Cerqueira, 1942
- Wyeomyia mystes Dyar, 1924

=== Subgenus (Triamyia) ===
- Wyeomyia aporonoma Dyar and Knab, 1906
- Wyeomyia staminifera Lourenço-de-Oliveira, Motta and de Castro, 1992

=== Subgenus (Zinzala) ===
- Wyeomyia fishi Zavortink, 1986
- Wyeomyia zinzala Zavortink, 1986

== See also ==
- List of Wyeomyia species
