= Carinamoeba =

Scientific classification
- Domain: Eukaryota
- Clade: Sar
- Clade: Alveolata
- Phylum: Apicomplexa
- Class: Aconoidasida
- Order: Haemospororida
- Family: Plasmodiidae
- Genus: Plasmodium
- Subgenus: Carinamoeba; Garnham, 1966

Species
- See text

Subgenus of single-celled organisms

Carinamoeba is a subgenus of the genus Plasmodium - all of which are parasitic unicellular eukaryotes.

The subgenus was created in 1966 by Garnham. Species in this subgenus infect reptiles.

== Diagnostic features ==
The original criterion for inclusion in this genus was the presence of small schizonts giving rise to 8 or less merozoites. The criteria were subsequently revised by Telford in 1988.

Species in the subgenus Carinamoeba have the following characteristics:

Small schizonts giving rise to 8 or less merozoites

The gametocytes like the schizonts are small.

== Species in this subgenus ==
- Plasmodium attenuatum
- Plasmodium auffenbergi
- Plasmodium basilisci
- Plasmodium clelandi
- Plasmodium cordyli
- Plasmodium lygosomae
- Plasmodium mabuiae
- Plasmodium minasense
- Plasmodium rhadinurum
- Plasmodium scelopori
- Plasmodium volans
