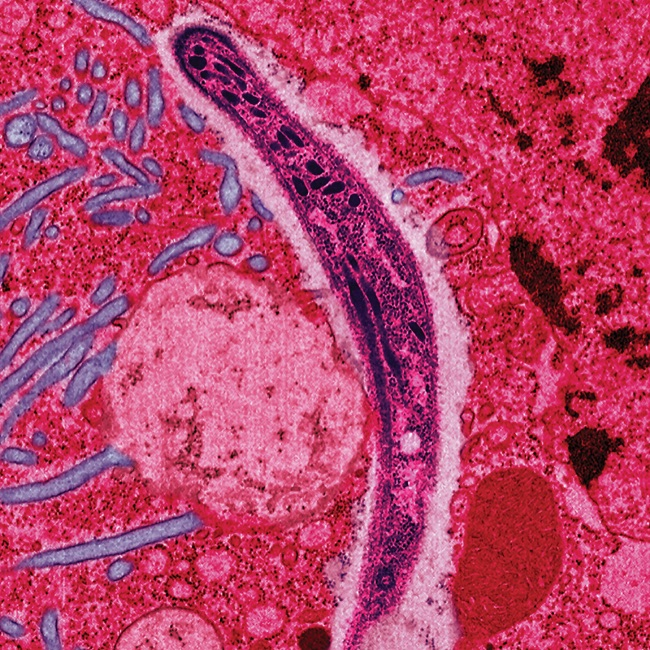

Scientific classification
- Domain: Eukaryota
- Clade: Sar
- Clade: Alveolata
- Phylum: Apicomplexa
- Class: Aconoidasida
- Order: Haemospororida
- Family: Plasmodiidae
- Genus: Plasmodium
- Subgenus: Huffia; Corradetti et al., 1963

Species
- Plasmodium elongatum; Plasmodium hermani; Plasmodium huffi

= Huffia =

Subgenus of single-celled organisms

Huffia is a subgenus of the genus Plasmodium - all of which are parasites. The subgenus was created in 1963 by Corradetti et al.. Species in this subgenus infect birds with malaria.

This subgenus is named in honour of the Dr. Clay G. Huff.

== Description ==
Species in the subgenus Huffia have the following characteristics:

- Mature schizonts, while varying in shape and size, contain plentiful cytoplasm and are commonly found in immature erthryocytes.
- Gametocytes are elongated.

P. huffi had been considered 'lost' since it hadn't been observed since its discovery in the 1950s, however it was re-discovered in toucans in 2021.
