= Piptostigma oyemense =

Conservation status
- Vulnerable (IUCN 3.1)

Scientific classification
- Kingdom: Plantae
- Clade: Embryophytes
- Clade: Tracheophytes
- Clade: Spermatophytes
- Clade: Angiosperms
- Clade: Magnoliids
- Order: Magnoliales
- Family: Annonaceae
- Genus: Piptostigma
- Species: P. oyemense

Binomial name
- Piptostigma oyemense Pellegr.

Species of flowering plant

Piptostigma oyemense is a species of plant in the Annonaceae family. It is native to Cameroon and Gabon.
