= Mesnilium =

Scientific classification
- Domain: Eukaryota
- Clade: Diaphoretickes
- Clade: SAR
- Clade: Alveolata
- Phylum: Apicomplexa
- Class: Aconoidasida
- Order: Haemospororida
- Family: Plasmodiidae
- Genus: Mesnilium; Misra, Haldar and Chakravarty, 1972
- Species: M. malariae

Binomial name
- Mesnilium malariae Misra, Haldar & Chakravarty, 1972

Genus of single-celled organisms

Mesnilium is a genus of parasitic alveolates belonging to the phylum Apicomplexa. Its vertebrate hosts are fish. The vectors are not presently known but are thought likely to be leeches.

== Taxonomy ==
The genus was created in 1972 by Misra, Haldar and Chakravarty.

== Description ==
Merogony occurs in erythrocytes and reticulo-endothelial cells. Gamogony occurs only in erythrocytes and pigment granules are present only in microgamonts and macrogametes.

== Hosts ==
The only known host of this parasite is the freshwater murrel (Ophicephalus punctatus).
