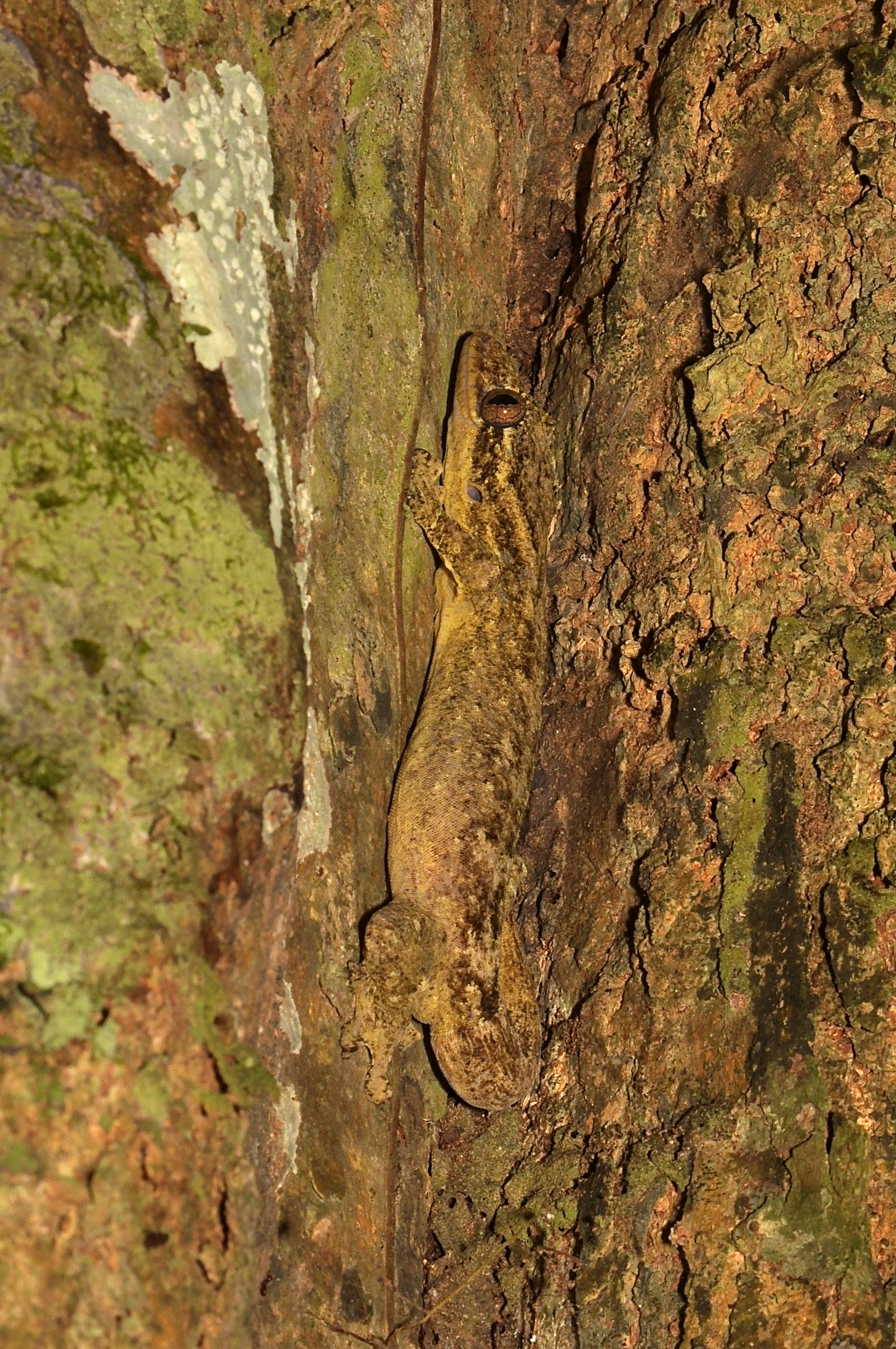
- Well-camouflaged Thecadactylus solimoensis

Scientific classification
- Domain: Eukaryota
- Kingdom: Animalia
- Phylum: Chordata
- Class: Reptilia
- Order: Squamata
- Infraorder: Gekkota
- Family: Phyllodactylidae
- Genus: Thecadactylus
- Species: T. solimoensis

Binomial name
- Thecadactylus solimoensis Bergmann & Russell, 2007

= Thecadactylus solimoensis =

Species of lizard

Thecadactylus solimoensis is a species of gecko described in 2007. It is often confused with T. rapicauda, the turnip-tailed gecko. This species is found at elevations of 120–200 m (390–660 ft) above sea level in Ecuador, Peru, Bolivia, southern Colombia and western Brazil, mostly within the headwaters of the Amazon river system.
