= Piptostigma calophyllum =

Conservation status
- Vulnerable (IUCN 3.1)

Scientific classification
- Kingdom: Plantae
- Clade: Embryophytes
- Clade: Tracheophytes
- Clade: Angiosperms
- Clade: Magnoliids
- Order: Magnoliales
- Family: Annonaceae
- Genus: Piptostigma
- Species: P. calophyllum

Binomial name
- Piptostigma calophyllum Mildbr. & Diels

Species of flowering plant

Piptostigma calophyllum is a species of flowering plant in the family Annonaceae. It is a tree native to Cameroon and Gabon. Its natural habitat is subtropical or tropical moist lowland forests. It is threatened by habitat loss. It is a tree and grows primarily in the wet tropical biome.
