= Piptostigma fugax =

Conservation status
- Least Concern (IUCN 3.1)

Scientific classification
- Kingdom: Plantae
- Clade: Tracheophytes
- Clade: Angiosperms
- Clade: Magnoliids
- Order: Magnoliales
- Family: Annonaceae
- Genus: Piptostigma
- Species: P. fugax

Binomial name
- Piptostigma fugax A.Chev. ex Hutch. & Dalziel

Species of flowering plant

Piptostigma fugax is a species of plant in the family Annonaceae. It is found in Ivory Coast, Ghana, and Liberia. It is threatened by habitat loss.
