= Dionisia =

Scientific classification
- Domain: Eukaryota
- Clade: Diaphoretickes
- Clade: SAR
- Clade: Alveolata
- Phylum: Apicomplexa
- Class: Aconoidasida
- Order: Haemospororida
- Family: Plasmodiidae
- Genus: Dionisia

Species
- Dionisia bunoi

Genus of single-celled organisms

Dionisia is a genus of parasitic alveolates belonging to the phylum Apicomplexa.

The type species of this genus is Dionisia bunoi.

== Taxonomy ==
The genus was described by Landau et al. in 1980.

== Description ==
The gametocytes are sexually dimorphic with the macrogametocytes being of the 'falciparum' type and the microgametocyte of the 'malariae' type.

The schizonts develop in the lumen of the liver blood vessels inside a greatly hypertrophied host cell. They remain moderate in size and their cytoplasm is not intensely basophilic as is usually in the young stages of other mammalian Haemosporidia.

== Hosts ==
The only known host of these parasites is the cyclops roundleaf bat (Hipposideros cyclops).

== Geographical location ==
These parasites are found in Gabon, Africa.
