= Maendeleo horseshoe bat =

Conservation status
- Data Deficient (IUCN 3.1)

Scientific classification
- Kingdom: Animalia
- Phylum: Chordata
- Class: Mammalia
- Order: Chiroptera
- Family: Rhinolophidae
- Genus: Rhinolophus
- Species: R. maendeleo

Binomial name
- Rhinolophus maendeleo Kock, Csorba & Howell, 2000
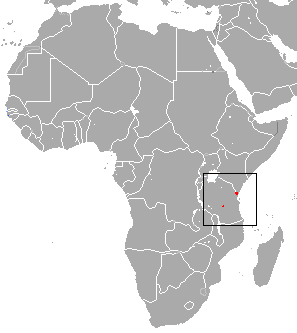
- Maendeleo horseshoe bat range

Species of bat

The Maendeleo horseshoe bat (Rhinolophus maendeleo) is a species of Tanzanian bats in the family Rhinolophidae. The species was first described in 2000 from specimens living in lowland coastal caves. The species has been evaluated as data deficient for a conservation status by the IUCN.

== Taxonomy ==
Rhinolophus maendeleo was described in 2000 by Dieter Kock, Gábor Csorba, and Kim Howell. Its closest relatives may be the Adam's horseshoe bat and the Namuli horseshoe bat, but genetic data is lacking for a definitive analysis. Within the genus Rhinolophus (the horseshoe bats), Kock et al assign it to a new group adami along with the eponymous species R. adami (Adam's horseshoe bat), also recognized by Demos et al (2019). On the other hand, F. P. D. Cotterill assigns it to the existing capensis group in a 2002 taxonomic analysis. The group was defined on the basis of morphological data only due to a lack of genetic data. The species name maendeleo is from Swahili for "progress", intended as an allusion to the improvements made in understanding Tanzanian bats.

== Habitat and conservation status ==
The Maendeleo horseshoe bat inhabits caves of the Coastal Lowland forests of Tanzania. As of 2018, the bat has only been definitively identified in two locations, Amboni Cave Forest, Mkulumuzi River Gorge, Tanga District (the type locality), and Mzaumbai Forest Reserve, Usambara Mountains. A 2010 bat inventory in Mozambique caught two specimens provisionally identified as R. maendeleo at Mount Namuli, but the species identification was uncertain due to minor differences from the holotype specimen. Later reanalysis found that these specimens actually represented a new species, Rhinolophus namuli, the Namuli horseshoe bat. As of 2025, its conservation status is currently evaluated as data deficient by the IUCN.

== Description ==
Rhinolophus maendeleo is a medium sized bat, with a forearm length of approximately 48 millimetres (1.9 in). It has a brown back fading to white on the lower stomach and loins, with a darker brown "collar" around the neck and upper chest. It has large ears with blunt tips.
