= Nunezia =

Scientific classification
- Kingdom: Animalia
- Phylum: Arthropoda
- Clade: Pancrustacea
- Class: Insecta
- Order: Diptera
- Family: Culicidae
- Genus: Wyeomyia
- Subgenus: Nunezia; Dyar, 1928

Subgenus of flies

Nunezia is a subgenus of the mosquito genus Wyeomyia. It was named to honor the Venezuelan entomologist Manuel Núñez Tovar.

The type species is Wyeomyia bicornis (Root, 1928). The subgenus includes the species Wyeomyia bicornis (Root), Wyeomyia lateralis Petrocchi, and Wyeomyia paucartamboensis Porter.
