= Bioccala =

Scientific classification
- Domain: Eukaryota
- Clade: Sar
- Clade: Alveolata
- Phylum: Apicomplexa
- Class: Aconoidasida
- Order: Haemospororida
- Family: Plasmodiidae
- Genus: Bioccala

Species
- Bioccala deanei

Genus of single-celled organisms

Bioccala is a genus of parasitic alveolates belonging to the phylum Apicomplexa.

== Taxonomy ==
This subgenus was raised to genus status by Landau et al. in 1984.

== Hosts ==
- Big brown bat (Eptesicus fuscus)
- Intermediate roundleaf bat (Hipposideros larvatus)

== Distribution ==
These parasites are found in Colombia and Thailand.
