= Rayella =

Scientific classification
- Domain: Eukaryota
- Clade: Diaphoretickes
- Clade: SAR
- Clade: Alveolata
- Phylum: Apicomplexa
- Class: Aconoidasida
- Order: Haemospororida
- Family: Plasmodiidae
- Genus: Rayella; Dasgupta, 1967

Species
- Rayella gigantica Rayella hylopetei Rayella rayi

Genus of single-celled organisms

Rayella is a genus of parasitic alveolates belonging to the phylum Apicomplexa. Its vertebrate hosts are flying squirrels. The vectors are not presently known.

== Taxonomy ==
This genus was described by Dasgupta in 1967.

== Hosts ==
- R. gigantica — spotted giant flying squirrel (Petaurista elegans caniceps)
- R. hylopetei — particoloured flying squirrel (Hylopetes alboniger)
- R. rayi — Himalayan flying squirrel (Petaurista magnificus)

== Distribution ==
All of the currently known species have been reported from Darjiling, India.
