= Billbraya =

Scientific classification
- Domain: Eukaryota
- Clade: Sar
- Clade: Alveolata
- Phylum: Apicomplexa
- Class: Aconoidasida
- Order: Haemospororida
- Family: Plasmodiidae
- Genus: Billbraya; Paperna and Landau, 1990
- Species: B. australis

Binomial name
- Billbraya australis Paperna and Landau, 1990

Genus of single-celled organisms

Billbraya is a genus of parasitic alveolates in the phylum Apicomplexa. It contains a single recognised species, Billbraya australis.

== Description ==
This genus was described in 1990 by Paperna and Landau. The genus is named after the parasitologist Robert ("Bill") Bray.

While merogony mostly occurs in the erythrocytes (typically 2 parasites per cell and up to 95% infection rates) it may also occur in the monocytes.

Gametocytes occur in the erythrocytes and may persist for months.

== Host range ==
The only known host for this species is the marbled gecko (Phyllodactylus marmoratus).

== Geographical range ==
This parasite is found in Australia.
