= Saurocytozoon =

Scientific classification
- Domain: Eukaryota
- Clade: Sar
- Clade: Alveolata
- Phylum: Apicomplexa
- Class: Aconoidasida
- Order: Haemospororida
- Family: Plasmodiidae
- Genus: Saurocytozoon

Species
- Saurocytozoon agamidorum Saurocytozoon mabuyi Saurocytozoon tupinambi

Genus of single-celled organisms

Saurocytozoon is a genus of parasitic alveolates. They infect reptiles and are thought to be transmitted by mosquitoes. Only two species have been described to date. Their relationship with the other members of this order is not presently clear.

== Description ==
Members of this genus infect reptiles. They do not produce pigment nor do they undergo merogony in the blood.

Schizonts are found in the tissues.

Gametocytes are found in the peripheral blood. They infect the leukocytes and cause gross distortion of the host cell. The gametocytes are large and round.

== Hosts ==
Skinks (Mabuya mabouya)
Tegu (Tupinambis teguixin)
