= Plasmodium giganteum =

Scientific classification
- Domain: Eukaryota
- Clade: Sar
- Clade: Alveolata
- Phylum: Apicomplexa
- Class: Aconoidasida
- Order: Haemospororida
- Family: Plasmodiidae
- Genus: Plasmodium
- Species: P. giganteum

Binomial name
- Plasmodium giganteum Theiler, 1930

Species of single-celled organism

Plasmodium giganteum is a parasite of the genus Plasmodium subgenus Sauramoeba. As in all Plasmodium species, P. giganteum has both vertebrate and insect hosts. The vertebrate hosts for this parasite are reptiles.

== Taxonomy ==
The parasite was first described by Theiler in 1930.

== Description ==
Plasmodium giganteum blood-stage parasites are described as being 2 to 6 times as large as the host cell nucleus. The gametocytes are round and elongated.

== Distribution ==
Plasmodium giganteum has only been described in Gbanga, Liberia.

== Hosts ==
Plasmodium giganteum infects the rainbow lizard (Agama agama), as well as Agama mossambica and Agama cyanogaster.
