= Piptostigma pilosum =

Conservation status
- Least Concern (IUCN 3.1)

Scientific classification
- Kingdom: Plantae
- Clade: Embryophytes
- Clade: Tracheophytes
- Clade: Spermatophytes
- Clade: Angiosperms
- Clade: Magnoliids
- Order: Magnoliales
- Family: Annonaceae
- Genus: Piptostigma
- Species: P. pilosum

Binomial name
- Piptostigma pilosum Oliv.

Synonyms
- Phaeanthus pilosus (Oliv.) Baill.; Piptostigma giganteum Hutch. & Dalziel

Species of flowering plant

Piptostigma giganteum is a species of flowering plant in the Annonaceae family. It is a tree native to southeastern Nigeria, Cameroon, Bioko, and Gabon. It is threatened by habitat loss.
