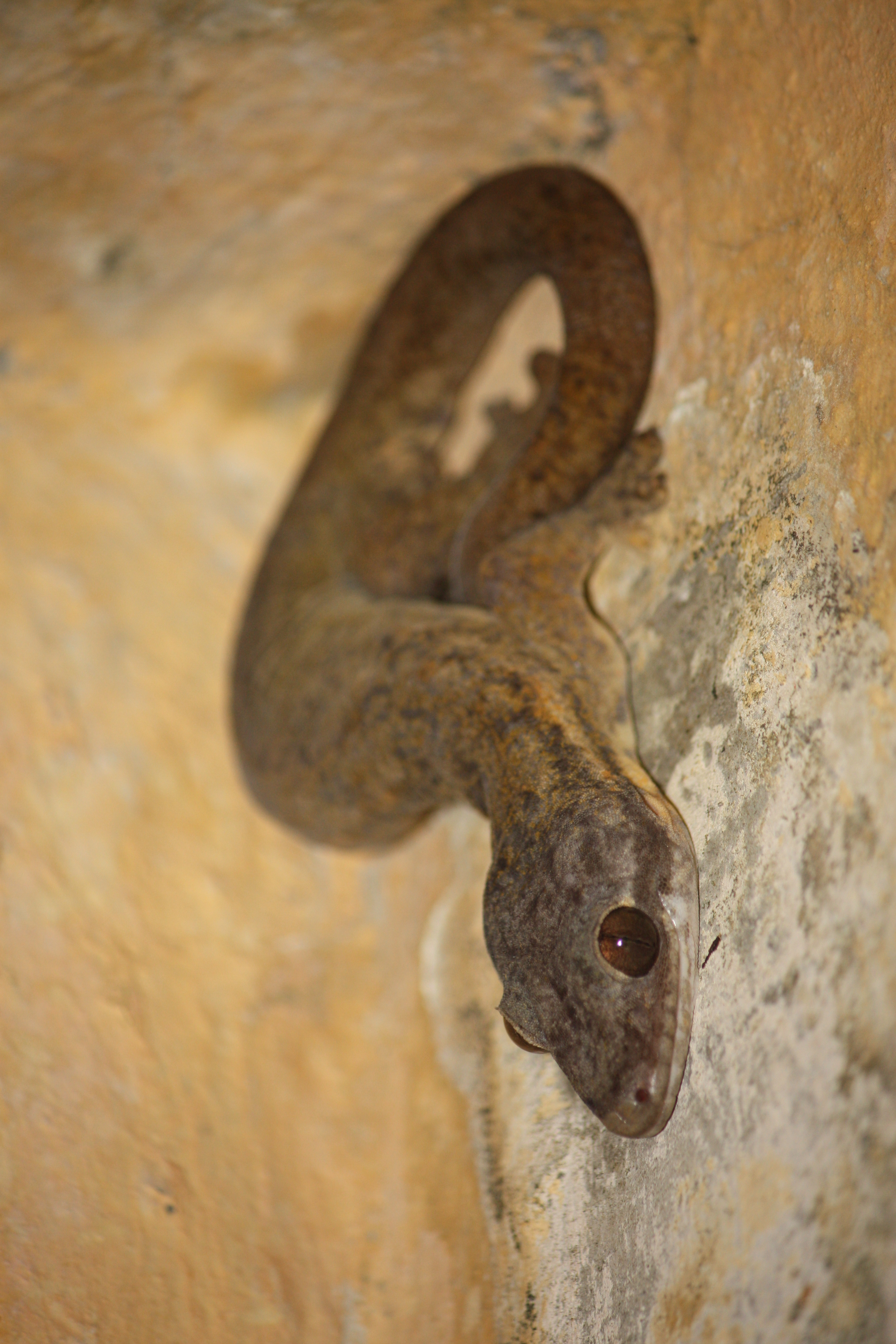
- in Dominica

Conservation status
- Least Concern (IUCN 3.1)

Scientific classification
- Kingdom: Animalia
- Phylum: Chordata
- Class: Reptilia
- Order: Squamata
- Suborder: Gekkota
- Family: Phyllodactylidae
- Genus: Thecadactylus
- Species: T. rapicauda

Binomial name
- Thecadactylus rapicauda (Houttuyn, 1782)

Synonyms
- Gekko rapicauda; Stellio perfoliatus; Gekko laevis; Gekko surinamensis; Platydactylus theconyx; Pachydactylus tristis; Platydactylus theconyx; Thecadactylus rapicaudus

= Turnip-tailed gecko =

Species of lizard

The turnip-tailed gecko (Thecadactylus rapicauda) is a species of gecko widely distributed from Mexico southward through Central America and into South America as far south as Brazil, and on many islands in the Lesser Antilles. It was long thought to be the only member of its genus, until T. solimoensis was described in 2007.

It is a large gecko, reaching a length of 120 mm snout-to-vent. Its color varies from pale to dark gray to deep orange. Individuals can also change color. It can vocalize a series of chirps, which it mainly does while active at night. Its name comes from its swollen tail, which is used to store fat. It also waves its tail as a sign of aggression, and can shed its tail to distract predators. They are nocturnal in nature and are frequently found 5–30 feet up the trunks of palm trees.

== Names ==
It is called tai-marɛɁa in the Kwaza language of Rondônia, Brazil.

== Predators ==
Predators of T. rapicauda include the phyllostomid bat, Chrotopterus auritus.

== Parasites ==
Parasites of T. rapicauda include the malarial parasite Plasmodium aurulentum.
