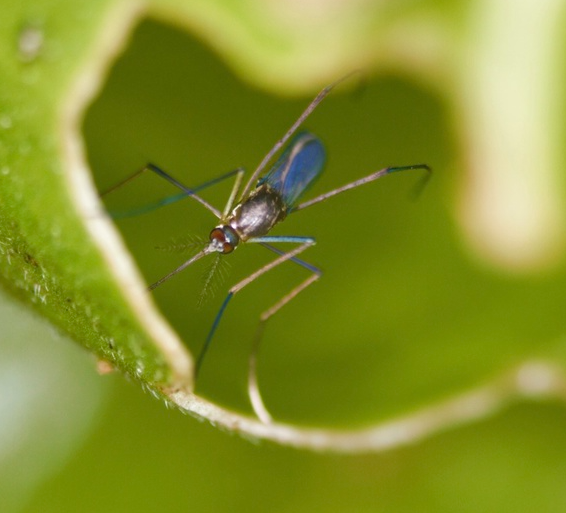
- Female
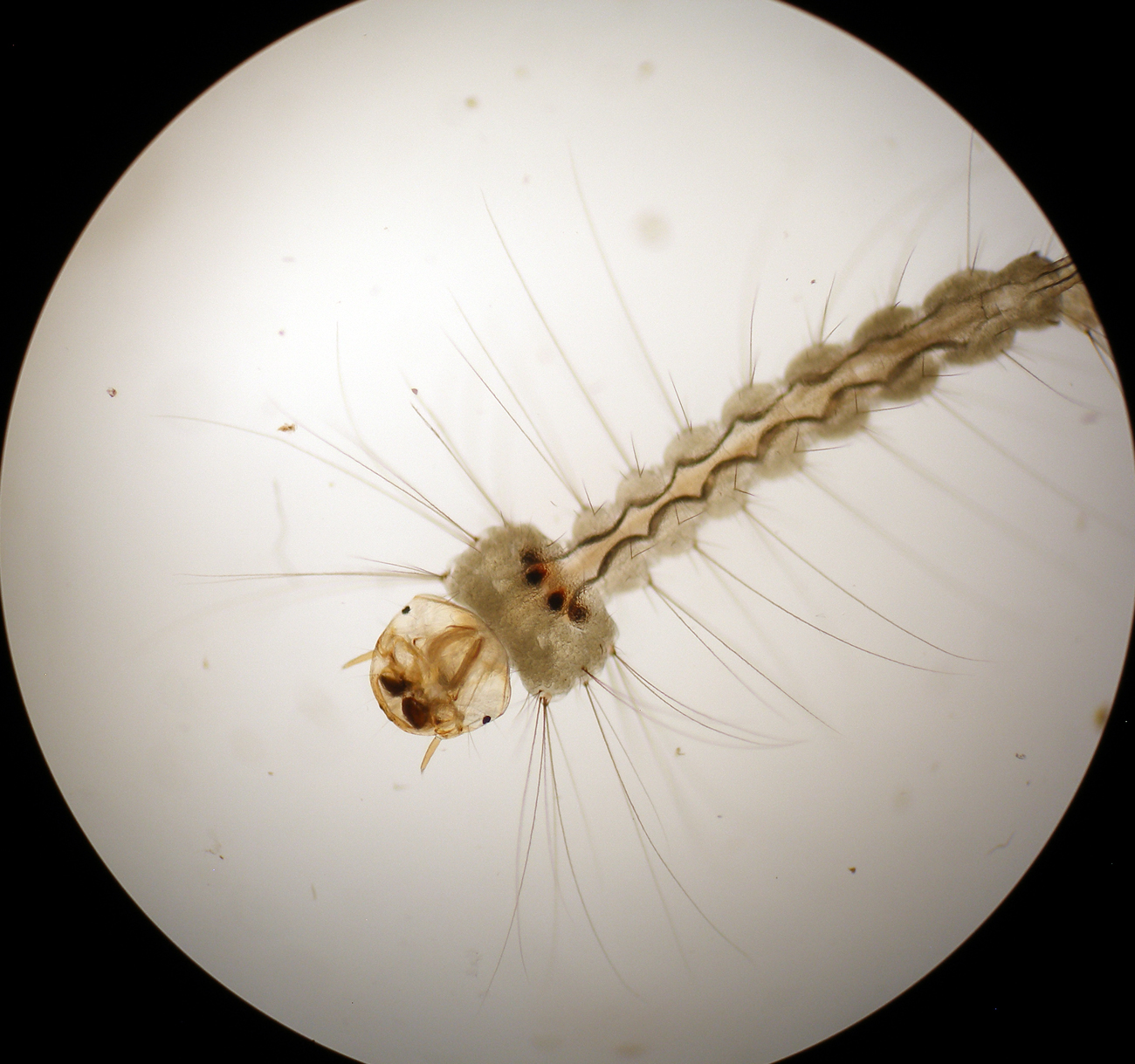
- Wyeomyia smithii larva magnified 40×

Scientific classification
- Kingdom: Animalia
- Phylum: Arthropoda
- Class: Insecta
- Order: Diptera
- Family: Culicidae
- Subfamily: Culicinae
- Tribe: Sabethini
- Genus: Wyeomyia
- Species: W. smithii

Binomial name
- Wyeomyia smithii Coquillett, 1901

= Wyeomyia smithii =

Species of mosquito

Wyeomyia smithii, the pitcher plant mosquito, is an inquiline mosquito that completes its pre-adult life cycle in the phytotelma (water-filled cavity) of the purple pitcher plant, Sarracenia purpurea. In this microcommunity of bacteria, rotifers, protozoa, and midges, W. smithii is the top-level predator; its presence determines the bacterial species diversity within the pitcher.

W. smithii is not a pest mosquito in general. The northern US population does not consume blood at all, while the southern US populations only consume blood after laying an initial egg batch; even then they appear disinterested in feeding. In fact, it is the only known mosquito to have both obligatory biting and non-biting populations in the same species.

== Life cycle ==
=== Description of the life cycle ===
The life cycle of Wyeomyia smithii begins in either late spring or early fall when the adult female lays her eggs in the phytotelma of a purple pitcher plant. The eggs then gestate in the pitcher plant anywhere from 1–8 days before they hatch as larvae. The larvae remain in the phytotelma feeding on bacteria, micro-animals, and decaying insects. The mosquito larvae will live in the pitcher plant until it goes through its fifth instar about 20 to 22 days after hatching. They then emerge as adult mosquitoes ready to mate. Wyeomyia smithii females will produce a clutch of fertilized eggs generally within two days of sexual maturity. Some populations in the southern United States have also been known to drink blood after producing their first clutch to help produce a second clutch; there are no reports of northern populations displaying this behavior, however.

== Photoperiodism ==
Wyeomyia smithii is a model organism for the study of photoperiodism, the biotic process of controlling seasonal life history events by measuring day length as a reliable predictor of the seasons. W. smithii enters a state of developmental arrest, larval diapause, that is initiated and maintained by short day lengths and averted or terminated by long day lengths. W. smithii has been observed to now require shorter days before going dormant, leading researchers to theorize that this is a result of microevolutionary selection under conditions of global warming; mosquitoes that wait longer to go dormant are favored due to their greater fitness in a warming climate.

Photoperiodism in Wyeomyia smithii is believed in nature to examine the startling finding that climate change can force genetic change in plants and animals. Wyeomyia smithii lives through the winter as diapausing larvae in the leaves of the pitcher plant. The pitcher-plant mosquito enters a hibernal diapause as larvae. Which means, short days initiate and maintain diapause, and long days promote continuous development in diapausing larvae. The day length promotes 50% development and 50% diapause (the critical photoperiod) as the same for the initiation and termination of not developing in unchilled larvae. For the initiation of not developing, insects pass through a "sensitive period" during which day length is interpreted as long or short, which results in a diapause/no-diapause response. Wyeomyia smithii is photoperiodic while in diapause. The sensitive period is indefinitely long, and the effect of manipulating different light–dark cycles can be assessed over weeks or months, instead of a few days. Wyeomyia smithii oviposits into and completes their entire preadult development only within the water-filled leaves of the carnivorous pitcher plant Sarracenia purpurea. Throughout this range, W. smithii occupies a uniform microhabitat whose community composition remains highly consistent. The photoperiodic response has been exposed to various seasonal changes, both in situ and during postglacial dispersal.

== Co-evolution of mosquito and plant ==
=== Plant adaptations ===
The purple pitcher plant (Sarracenia purpurea), which houses W. smithii, is known to be the most habitable pitcher plant for many different inquilines. At least 165 various species of insects, protozoa, algae, and other organisms can live within the purple pitcher plant. The plant has adapted to have fluid with a higher pH than other, more acidic, carnivorous pitcher plants. There is little fluid secreted by this plant in comparison to the rainwater it collects in its pitcher, which dilutes the solution and creates a more habitable environment for outside organisms. The plant's adaptation allowing it to host diverse life is an advantage to the mosquito because its larvae prey upon those organisms. The mosquitos also prey on the food that the pitcher plant catches, giving them a steady food source.

=== Mosquito evolution and adaptations ===
The pitcher plant mosquito, Wyeomyia smithii, has been featured in scientific studies because of its co-evolution with the purple pitcher plant. The relationship between the two species highlights a genetic response to climate change, which details how a population can evolve at a quicker pace in order to make accommodations due to the changes in climate. The water-filled pitcher plant proved to be a suitable home for the mosquito in its habitat range. It is because both species can endure a temperate climate. This idea makes the pitcher plant the next option for this mosquito species to stay in its current domain.

The relationship is beneficial for both species and allows them to continue to evolve together. The purple pitcher plant uses the mosquito for nutrients once the mosquitoes die off. And, these mosquitoes are no different than any other subspecies, in terms of attraction, they are drawn to water. The pitcher plant is filled with water and this is a type of environment that is used as a location for female mosquitoes to lay their eggs. Most pitcher plant mosquitoes tend to frequent a pitcher plant younger in age. Not only does the plant provide a steady source of food, it is a protective place for larvae to develop.
