= Plasmodium wenyoni =

Scientific classification
- Domain: Eukaryota
- Clade: Sar
- Clade: Alveolata
- Phylum: Apicomplexa
- Class: Aconoidasida
- Order: Haemospororida
- Family: Plasmodiidae
- Genus: Plasmodium
- Species: P. wenyoni

Binomial name
- Plasmodium wenyoni Garnham, 1965

Species of single-celled organism

Plasmodium wenyoni is a parasite of the genus Plasmodium. As in all Plasmodium species, P. wenyoni has both vertebrate and insect hosts. The vertebrate hosts for this parasite are reptiles.

== Taxonomy ==
The parasite was first described by Garnham in 1965. The original host was a Thamnodynastes pallidus that died in a London zoo in 1934.

== Distribution ==
This species is found in Brazil.

== Hosts ==
The only known hosts of this species are snakes.

The insect vectors for this species are mosquitoes of the genus Culex.

Fever in the infected snake is irregular.
