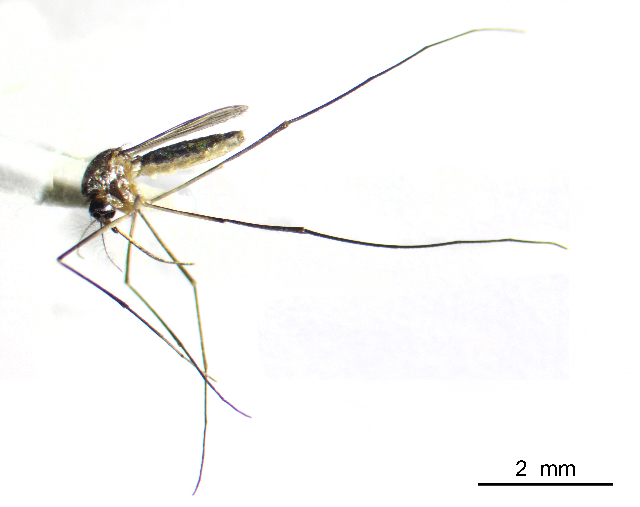

Scientific classification
- Domain: Eukaryota
- Kingdom: Animalia
- Phylum: Arthropoda
- Class: Insecta
- Order: Diptera
- Family: Culicidae
- Genus: Wyeomyia
- Species: W. mitchellii

Binomial name
- Wyeomyia mitchellii (Theobald, 1905)

Synonyms
- Dendromyia jamaicensis Theobald, 1905; Dendromyia mitchellii Theobald, 1905; Wyeomyia antoinetta Dyar and Knab, 1909

= Wyeomyia mitchellii =

Species of fly

Wyeomyia mitchellii, the bromeliad mosquito, is a species of mosquito in the family Culicidae.
