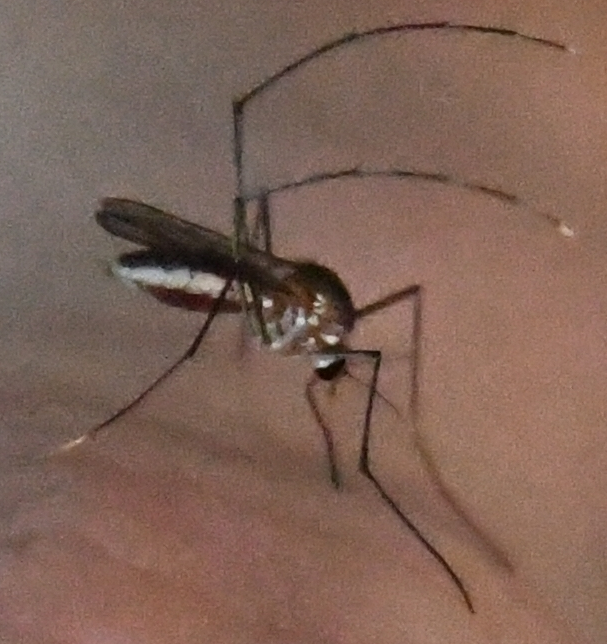
- Female

Scientific classification
- Domain: Eukaryota
- Kingdom: Animalia
- Phylum: Arthropoda
- Class: Insecta
- Order: Diptera
- Family: Culicidae
- Genus: Wyeomyia
- Species: W. vanduzeei

Binomial name
- Wyeomyia vanduzeei Dyar & Knab, 1906

= Wyeomyia vanduzeei =

Species of fly

Wyeomyia vanduzeei is a species of mosquito in the family Culicidae.
