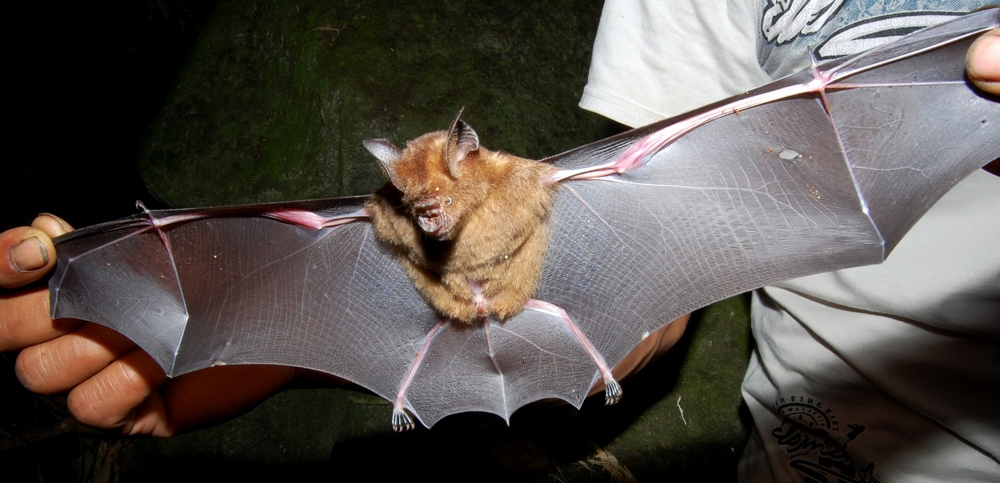
- from southern Lampung, Sumatra

Conservation status
- Least Concern (IUCN 3.1)

Scientific classification
- Kingdom: Animalia
- Phylum: Chordata
- Class: Mammalia
- Order: Chiroptera
- Family: Hipposideridae
- Genus: Macronycteris
- Species: H. larvatus

Binomial name
- Hipposideros larvatus (Horsfield, 1823)
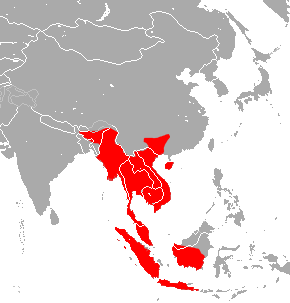
- Intermediate roundleaf bat range

= Intermediate roundleaf bat =

Species of bat

The intermediate roundleaf bat (Hipposideros larvatus) is a species of bat in the family Hipposideridae. It is found in Bangladesh, Cambodia, China, India, Indonesia, Laos, Malaysia, Myanmar, Thailand, and Vietnam.
