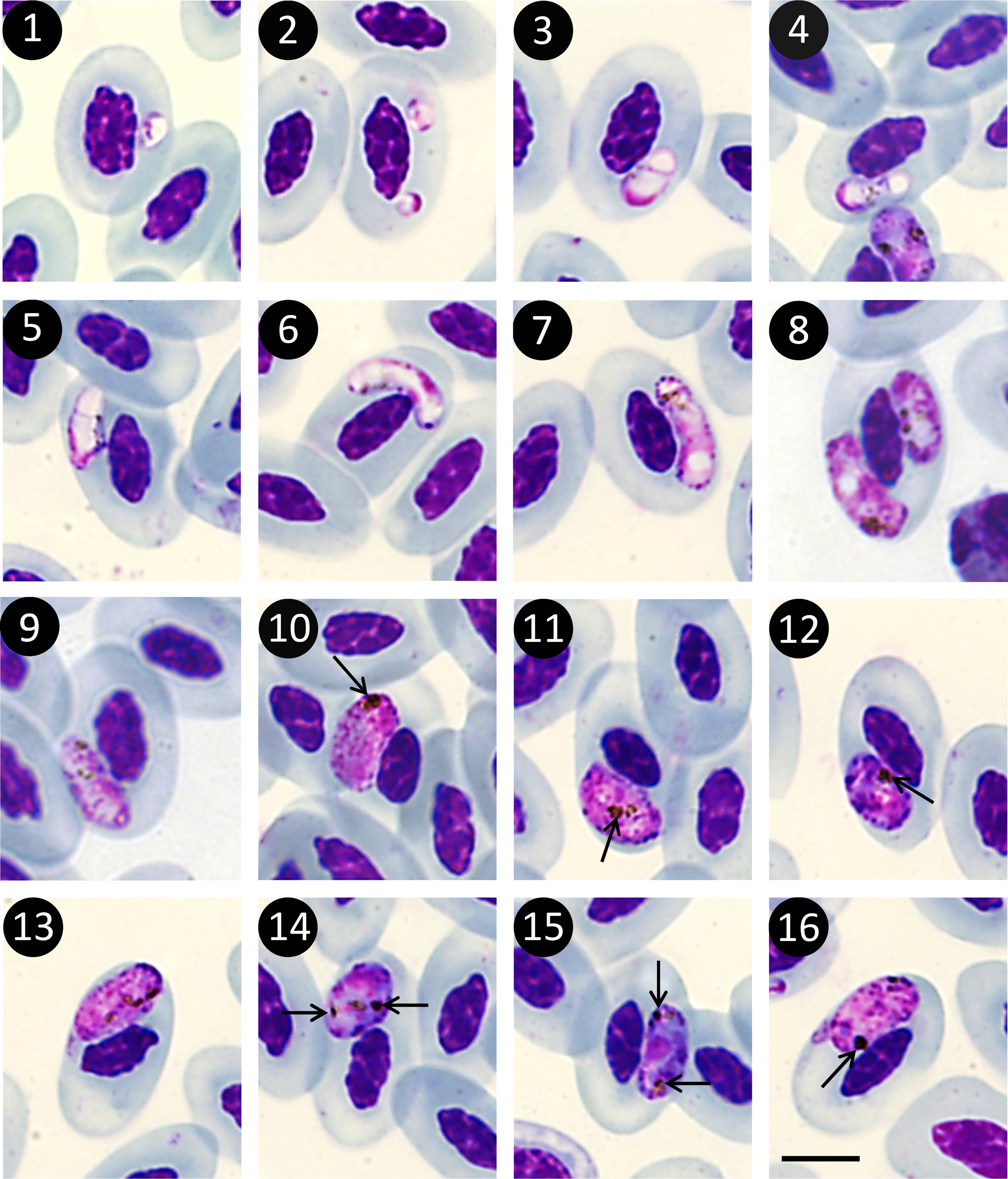
- Haemoproteus ilanpapernai (Haemoproteidae)

Scientific classification
- Domain: Eukaryota
- Clade: Sar
- Clade: Alveolata
- Phylum: Apicomplexa
- Class: Aconoidasida
- Order: Haemosporida

Families
- Garniidae; Haemoproteidae; Leucocytozoidae; Plasmodiidae

= Haemosporida =

Order of protists

The Haemosporida (sometimes called Haemospororida) are an order of intraerythrocytic parasitic alveolates.

== Taxonomy ==
Over 500 species are in this order, organised into four families: the Garniidae, the Haemoproteidae, the Leucocytozoidae, and the Plasmodiidae. The majority of the species lie within three genera: Haemoproteus, Leucocytozoon, and Plasmodium.

The Haemoproteidae and the Plasmodiidae both produce pigment. These families have been placed in the suborder Laveraniina. Neither the Haemoproteidae nor the Leucocytozoidae have an asexual cycle in the peripheral blood. The Garniidae do not produce pigment, but do have an asexual cycle in the blood.

The taxa in detail are:

- Family Garniidae
  - Genus Fallisia Lainson, Landau & Shaw 1974
    - Subgenus Fallisia
    - Subgenus Plasmodioides Gabaldon, Ulloa and Zerpa 1985
  - Genus Garnia Lainson, Landau and Shaw 1971
  - Genus Progarnia Lainson 1995
- Family Haemoproteidae
  - Genus Johnsprentia Landau, Chavatte & Beveridge 2012
  - Genus Haemocystidium Castellani and Willey 1904, emend. Telford 1996
  - Genus Haemoproteus Kruse 1890
    - Subgenus Haemoproteus
    - Subgenus Parahaemoproteus Bennett et al 1965
  - Genus Paleohaemoproteus Poinar and Telford 2005
  - Genus Sprattiella Landau et al 2012
- Family Leucocytozoidae
  - Genus Leucocytozoon Ziemann 1898 emend. Berestneff 1904, Sambon 1908
    - Subgenus Akiba
    - Subgenus Leucocytozoon
- Family Plasmodiidae
  - Genus Bioccala Landau et al 1984
  - Genus Biguetiella Landau et al 1984
  - Genus Billbraya Paperna and Landau 1990
  - Genus Dionisia Landau et al 1980
  - Genus Hepatocystis Miller 1908
  - Genus Mesnilium Misra, Haldar and Chakravarty 1972
  - Genus Nycteria Garnham and Heisch 1953
  - Genus Plasmodium Marchiafava and Celli 1885
    - Subgenus Asiamoeba Telford 1988
    - Subgenus Bennettinia Valkiūnas 1997
    - Subgenus Carinamoeba Garnham 1966
    - Subgenus Giovannolaia Corradetti, Garnham & Laird 1963
    - Subgenus Haemamoeba Grassi & Feletti 1890
    - Subgenus Huffia Garnham & Laird 1963
    - Subgenus Lacertamoeba Telford 1988
    - Subgenus Laverania Bray 1963
    - Subgenus Novyella Corradetti, Garnham & Laird 1963
    - Subgenus Nyssorhynchus Poinar 2005
    - Subgenus Ophidiella Garnham 1966
    - Subgenus Papernaia Landau et al 2010
    - Subgenus Paraplasmodium Telford 1988
    - Subgenus Plasmodium Bray 1963 emend. Garnham 1964
    - Subgenus Sauramoeba Garnham 1966
    - Subgenus Vinckeia Garnham 1964
  - Genus Polychromophilus Landau et al 1984
  - Genus Rayella Dasgupta 1967
  - Genus Saurocytozoon Lainson and Shaw 1969
  - Genus †Vetufebrus Poinar 2011

=== Note ===
The genus Mesnilium is the only group that infects fish. The genus has a single species and has been reported only once. This genus may have been mistakenly placed in this genus. DNA studies are likely to be needed to clarify this point.

Several genera infect mammals: Bioccala, Biguetiella, Dionisia, Hepatocystis, Plasmodium, Polychromophilus, Nycteria, and Rayella.

The insect vectors of Hepatocystis, Plasmodium and Polychromophilus are Ceratopogonidae, Culicidae, and Nycteribiidae, respectively. The vectors of Nycteria and Rayella are currently unknown. Bioccala also uses Nycteribiidae as its insect vector.

Rayella is thought to have originated from Hepatocystis.

=== Other genera that may be related ===
- Chelonplasma

Pirhemocyton although once thought to be a protozoan has since been shown to be intraerythrocytic inclusion bodies due to a viral infection.

== Phylogenetics ==
Morrison has shown using molecular data that the Haemosporidia are nested within the gregarines and that this clade is distinct from the piroplasms. This latter clade is a sister group of the coccidians.
