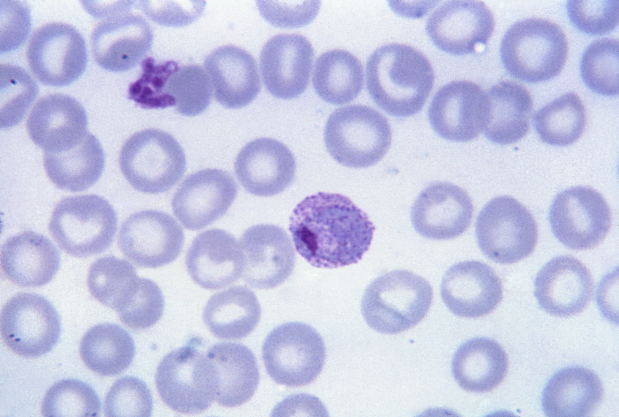
- A mature Plasmodium vivax trophozoite

Scientific classification
- Domain: Eukaryota
- Clade: Sar
- Clade: Alveolata
- Phylum: Apicomplexa
- Class: Aconoidasida
- Order: Haemospororida
- Family: Plasmodiidae; Mesnil, 1903

Genera
- See text

= Plasmodiidae =

Family of apicomplexan protists

The Plasmodiidae are a family of apicomplexan parasites, including the type genus Plasmodium, which is responsible for malaria. This family was erected in 1903 by Mesnil and is one of the four families in the order Haemospororida.

== Diagnostic criteria ==
The diagnostic criteria of the Plasmodiidae are:

- Macrogametes and microgamonts develop independently
- Meiosis is absent
- Microgametocyte produces eight flagellated microgametes
- Zygote is motile (known as an ookinete)
- Conoid present in ookinete stage only
- Sporozoites naked in oocyst (that is without a sporocyst)
- Sporozoites have three walls
- Heteroxenous: merogony and gamogony occur in vertebrate host, and fertilization and sporogony in definitive host (a blood-sucking insect)
- Hemozoin pigment is produced

== Taxonomy ==
The family Plasmodiidae has three sister taxa in the order Haemospororida: the families Garniidae, Haemoproteidae, and Leucocytozoidae.

The Haemoproteidae and the Plasmodiidae both produce pigment, and these have been placed in the suborder Laveraniina.

Neither the Haemoproteidae nor the Leucocytozoidae have an asexual cycle in the peripheral blood.

The Garniidae do not produce pigment, but do have an asexual cycle in the blood. They appear to be the earliest diverging clade in this group.

The Plasmodiidae contain these genera:

- Genus Bioccala Landau et al 1984
- Genus Biguetiella Landau et al 1984
- Genus Billbraya Paperna & Landau 1990
- Genus Dionisia Landau et al 1980
- Genus Hepatocystis Miller 1908
- Genus Mesnilium Misra, Haldar & Chakravarty 1972
- Genus Nycteria Garnham and Heisch 1953
- Genus Plasmodium Marchiafava & Celli 1885
  - Subgenus Asiamoeba Telford 1988
  - Subgenus Bennettinia Valkiūnas 1997
  - Subgenus Carinamoeba Garnham 1966
  - Subgenus Giovannolaia Corradetti, Garnham & Laird 1963
  - Subgenus Haemamoeba Grassi & Feletti 1890
  - Subgenus Huffia Garnham & Laird 1963
  - Subgenus Lacertamoeba Telford 1988
  - Subgenus Laverania Bray 1963
  - Subgenus Novyella Corradetti, Garnham & Laird 1963
  - Subgenus Ophidiella Garnham 1966
  - Subgenus Paraplasmodium Telford 1988
  - Subgenus Plasmodium Bray 1963 emend. Garnham 1964
  - Subgenus Sauramoeba Garnham 1966
  - Subgenus Vinckeia Garnham 1964
- Genus Polychromophilus Landau et al 1984
- Genus Rayella Dasgupta 1967
- Genus Saurocytozoon Lainson & Shaw 1969
- Genus †Vetufebrus Poinar 2011

The genus Mesnilium is the only taxon that infects fish. The genus has a single species and has been reported only once. This genus may have been mistakenly placed in this family. DNA studies are likely to be needed to clarify this point.
