= DNA vaccine =

Vaccine containing DNA

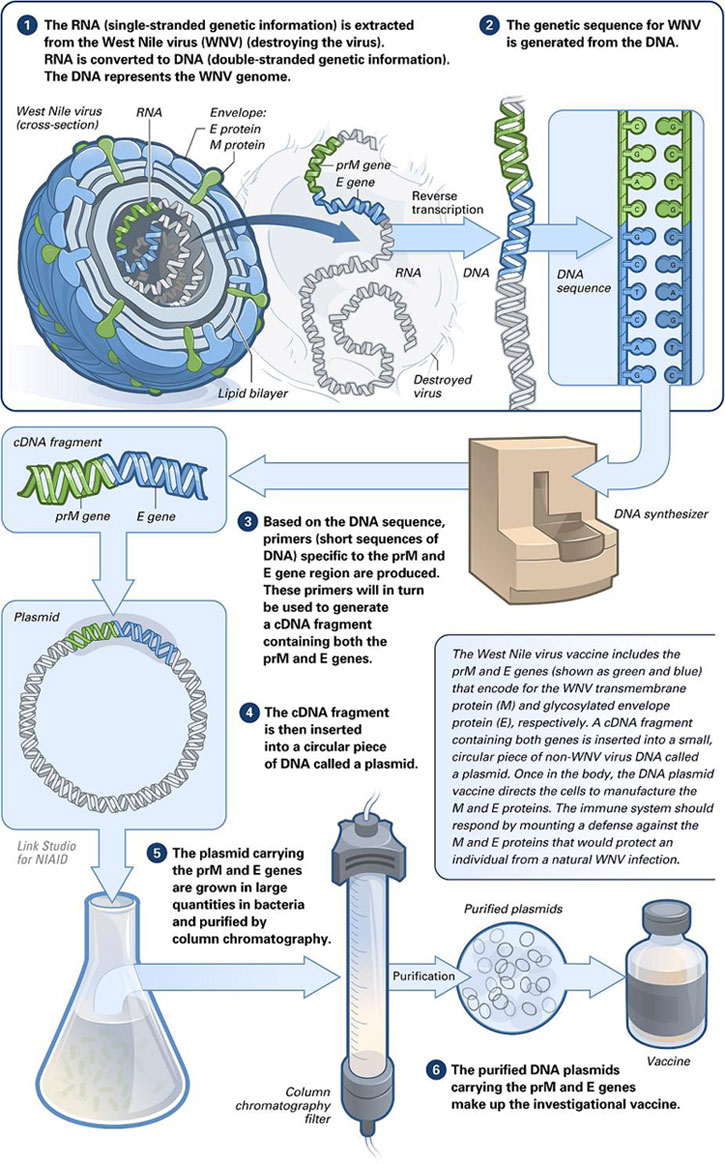
The making of a DNA vaccine

A DNA vaccine is a type of vaccine that transfects a specific antigen-coding DNA sequence into the cells of an organism as a mechanism to induce an immune response.

DNA vaccines work by injecting genetically engineered plasmid containing the DNA sequence encoding the antigen(s) against which an immune response is sought, so the cells directly produce the antigen, thus causing a protective immunological response. DNA vaccines have theoretical advantages over conventional vaccines, including the "ability to induce a wider range of types of immune response". Several DNA vaccines have been tested for veterinary use. In some cases, protection from disease in animals has been obtained, in others not. Research is ongoing over the approach for viral, bacterial and parasitic diseases in humans, as well as for cancers. In August 2021, Indian authorities gave emergency approval to ZyCoV-D. Developed by Cadila Healthcare, it is the first DNA vaccine approved for humans.

== History ==
Conventional vaccines contain either specific antigens from a pathogen, or attenuated viruses which stimulate an immune response in the vaccinated organism. DNA vaccines are members of the genetic vaccines, because they contain a genetic information (DNA or RNA) that codes for the cellular production (protein biosynthesis) of an antigen. DNA vaccines contain DNA that codes for specific antigens from a pathogen. The DNA is injected into the body and taken up by cells, whose normal metabolic processes synthesize proteins based on the genetic code in the plasmid that they have taken up. Because these proteins contain regions of amino acid sequences that are characteristic of bacteria or viruses, they are recognized as foreign and when they are processed by the host cells and displayed on their surface, the immune system is alerted, which then triggers immune responses. Alternatively, the DNA may be encapsulated in protein to facilitate cell entry. If this capsid protein is included in the DNA, the resulting vaccine can combine the potency of a live vaccine without reversion risks.

In 1983, Enzo Paoletti and Dennis Panicali at the New York Department of Health devised a strategy to produce recombinant DNA vaccines by using genetic engineering to transform ordinary smallpox vaccine into vaccines that may be able to prevent other diseases. They altered the DNA of cowpox virus by inserting a gene from other viruses (namely Herpes simplex virus, hepatitis B and influenza). In 1993, Jeffrey Ulmer and co-workers at Merck Research Laboratories demonstrated that direct injection of mice with plasmid DNA encoding a flu antigen protected the animals against subsequent experimental infection with influenza virus. In 2016 a DNA vaccine for the Zika virus began testing in humans at the National Institutes of Health. The study was planned to involve up to 120 subjects aged between 18 and 35. Separately, Inovio Pharmaceuticals and GeneOne Life Science began tests of a different DNA vaccine against Zika in Miami. The NIH vaccine is injected into the upper arm under high pressure. Manufacturing the vaccines in volume remained unsolved as of August 2016. Clinical trials for DNA vaccines to prevent HIV are underway.

In August 2021, Indian authorities gave emergency approval to ZyCoV-D. Developed by Cadila Healthcare, it is the first DNA vaccine against COVID-19.

== Applications ==
As of 2021 no DNA vaccines have been approved for human use in the United States. Few experimental trials have evoked a response strong enough to protect against disease and the technique's usefulness remains to be proven in humans.

A veterinary DNA vaccine to protect horses from West Nile virus has been approved. Another West Nile virus vaccine has been tested successfully on American robins.

DNA immunization is also being investigated as a means of developing antivenom sera. DNA immunization can be used as a technology platform for monoclonal antibody induction.

== Advantages ==
- No risk for infections
- Antigen presentation by both MHC class I and class II molecules
- Polarise T-cell response toward type 1 or type 2
- Immune response focused on the antigen of interest
- Ease of development and production
- Stability for storage and shipping
- Cost-effectiveness
- Obviates need for peptide synthesis, expression and purification of recombinant proteins and use of toxic adjuvants
- Long-term persistence of immunogen
- In vivo expression ensures protein more closely resembles normal eukaryotic structure, with accompanying post-translational modifications

== Disadvantages ==
- Limited to protein immunogens (not useful for non-protein based antigens such as bacterial polysaccharides)
- Potential for atypical processing of bacterial and parasite proteins
- Potential when using nasal spray administration of plasmid DNA nanoparticles to transfect non-target cells, such as brain cells
- Cross-contamination when manufacturing different types of live vaccines in same facility

== Plasmid vectors ==
=== Vector design ===
DNA vaccines elicit the best immune response when high-expression vectors are used. These are plasmids that usually consist of a strong viral promoter to drive the in vivo transcription and translation of the gene (or complementary DNA) of interest. Intron A may sometimes be included to improve mRNA stability and hence increase protein expression. Plasmids also include a strong polyadenylation/transcriptional termination signal, such as bovine growth hormone or rabbit beta-globulin polyadenylation sequences. Polycistronic vectors (with multiple genes of interest) are sometimes constructed to express more than one immunogen, or to express an immunogen and an immunostimulatory protein.

Because the plasmid – carrying relatively small genetic code up to about 200 Kbp – is the "vehicle" from which the immunogen is expressed, optimising vector design for maximal protein expression is essential. One way of enhancing protein expression is by optimising the codon usage of pathogenic mRNAs for eukaryotic cells. Pathogens often have different AT-contents than the target species, so altering the gene sequence of the immunogen to reflect the codons more commonly used in the target species may improve its expression.

Another consideration is the choice of promoter. The SV40 promoter was conventionally used until research showed that vectors driven by the Rous Sarcoma Virus (RSV) promoter had much higher expression rates. More recently, expression and immunogenicity have been further increased in model systems by the use of the cytomegalovirus (CMV) immediate early promoter, and a retroviral cis-acting transcriptional element. Additional modifications to improve expression rates include the insertion of enhancer sequences, synthetic introns, adenovirus tripartite leader (TPL) sequences and modifications to the polyadenylation and transcriptional termination sequences. An example of DNA vaccine plasmid is pVAC, which uses SV40 promoter.

Structural instability phenomena are of particular concern for plasmid manufacture, DNA vaccination and gene therapy. Accessory regions pertaining to the plasmid backbone may engage in a wide range of structural instability phenomena. Well-known catalysts of genetic instability include direct, inverted and tandem repeats, which are conspicuous in many commercially available cloning and expression vectors. Therefore, the reduction or complete elimination of extraneous noncoding backbone sequences would pointedly reduce the propensity for such events to take place and consequently the overall plasmid's recombinogenic potential.

=== Mechanism of plasmids ===
Once the plasmid inserts itself into the transfected cell nucleus, it codes for a peptide string of a foreign antigen. On its surface the cell displays the foreign antigen with both histocompatibility complex (MHC) classes I and class II molecules. The antigen-presenting cell then travels to the lymph nodes and presents the antigen peptide and costimulatory molecule signalling to T-cell, initiating the immune response.

=== Vaccine insert design ===
Immunogens can be targeted to various cellular compartments to improve antibody or cytotoxic T-cell responses. Secreted or plasma membrane-bound antigens are more effective at inducing antibody responses than cytosolic antigens, while cytotoxic T-cell responses can be improved by targeting antigens for cytoplasmic degradation and subsequent entry into the major histocompatibility complex (MHC) class I pathway. This is usually accomplished by the addition of N-terminal ubiquitin signals.

The conformation of the protein can also affect antibody responses. "Ordered" structures (such as viral particles) are more effective than unordered structures. Strings of minigenes (or MHC class I epitopes) from different pathogens raise cytotoxic T-cell responses to some pathogens, especially if a TH epitope is also included.

== Delivery ==
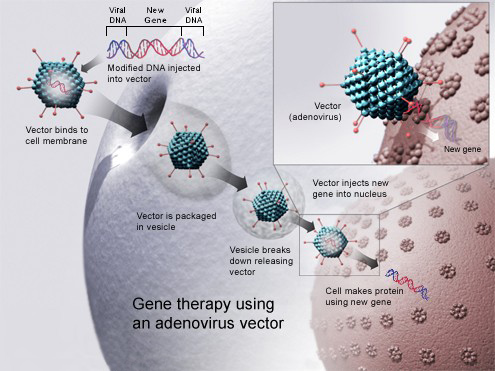
DNA vaccine and Gene therapy techniques are similar.

DNA vaccines have been introduced into animal tissues by multiple methods. In 1999, the two most popular approaches were injection of DNA in saline: by using a standard hypodermic needle, or by using a gene gun delivery. Several other techniques have been documented in the intervening years.

=== Saline injection ===
Injection in saline is normally conducted intramuscularly (IM) in skeletal muscle, or intradermally (ID), delivering DNA to extracellular spaces. This can be assisted either 1) by electroporation; 2) by temporarily damaging muscle fibres with myotoxins such as bupivacaine; or 3) by using hypertonic solutions of saline or sucrose. Immune responses to this method can be affected by factors including needle type, needle alignment, speed of injection, volume of injection, muscle type, and age, sex and physiological condition of the recipient.

=== Gene gun ===
Gene gun delivery ballistically accelerates plasmid DNA (pDNA) that has been absorbed onto gold or tungsten microparticles into the target cells, using compressed helium as an accelerant.

=== Mucosal surface delivery ===
Alternatives included aerosol instillation of naked DNA on mucosal surfaces, such as the nasal and lung mucosa, and topical administration of pDNA to the eye and vaginal mucosa. Mucosal surface delivery has also been achieved using cationic liposome-DNA preparations, biodegradable microspheres, attenuated Salmonalla, Shigella or Listeria vectors for oral administration to the intestinal mucosa and recombinant adenovirus vectors.

=== Polymer vehicle ===
A hybrid vehicle composed of bacteria cell and synthetic polymers has been employed for DNA vaccine delivery. An E. coli inner core and poly(beta-amino ester) outer coat function synergistically to increase efficiency by addressing barriers associated with antigen-presenting cell gene delivery which include cellular uptake and internalization, phagosomal escape and intracellular cargo concentration. Tested in mice, the hybrid vector was found to induce immune response.

=== ELI immunization ===
Another approach to DNA vaccination is expression library immunization (ELI). Using this technique, potentially all the genes from a pathogen can be delivered at one time, which may be useful for pathogens that are difficult to attenuate or culture. ELI can be used to identify which genes induce a protective response. This has been tested with Mycoplasma pulmonis, a murine lung pathogen with a relatively small genome. Even partial expression libraries can induce protection from subsequent challenge.

== Dosage ==
The delivery method determines the dose required to raise an effective immune response. Saline injections require variable amounts of DNA, from 10 μg to 1 mg, whereas gene gun deliveries require 100 to 1000 times less. Generally, 0.2 μg – 20 μg are required, although quantities as low as 16 ng have been reported. These quantities vary by species. Mice for example, require approximately 10 times less DNA than primates. Saline injections require more DNA because the DNA is delivered to the extracellular spaces of the target tissue (normally muscle), where it has to overcome physical barriers (such as the basal lamina and large amounts of connective tissue) before it is taken up by the cells, while gene gun deliveries drive/force DNA directly into the cells, resulting in less "wastage".

== Immune response ==
=== Helper T cell responses ===
Antigen presentation stimulates T cells to become either "cytotoxic" CD8+ cells or "helper" CD4+ cells. Cytotoxic cells directly attack other cells carrying certain foreign or abnormal molecules on their surfaces. Helper T cells, or Th cells, coordinate immune responses by communicating with other cells. In most cases, T cells only recognize an antigen if it is carried on the surface of a cell by one of the body's own MHC, or major histocompatibility complex, molecules.

DNA immunization can raise multiple T_{H} responses, including lymphoproliferation and the generation of a variety of cytokine profiles. A major advantage of DNA vaccines is the ease with which they can be manipulated to bias the type of T-cell help towards a TH1 or TH2 response. Each type has distinctive patterns of lymphokine and chemokine expression, specific types of immunoglobulins, patterns of lymphocyte trafficking and types of innate immune responses.

==== Other types of T-cell help ====
The type of T-cell help raised is influenced by the delivery method and the type of immunogen expressed, as well as the targeting of different lymphoid compartments. Generally, saline needle injections (either IM or ID) tend to induce TH1 responses, while gene gun delivery raises TH2 responses. This is true for intracellular and plasma membrane-bound antigens, but not for secreted antigens, which seem to generate TH2 responses, regardless of the method of delivery.

Generally the type of T-cell help raised is stable over time, and does not change when challenged or after subsequent immunizations that would normally have raised the opposite type of response in a naïve specimen. However, Mor et al.. (1995) immunized and boosted mice with pDNA encoding the circumsporozoite protein of the mouse malarial parasite Plasmodium yoelii (PyCSP) and found that the initial TH2 response changed, after boosting, to a TH1 response.

==== Basis for different types of T-cell help ====
How these different methods operate, the forms of antigen expressed, and the different profiles of T-cell help is not understood. It was thought that the relatively large amounts of DNA used in IM injection were responsible for the induction of TH1 responses. However, evidence shows no dose-related differences in TH type. The type of T-cell help raised is determined by the differentiated state of antigen presenting cells. Dendritic cells can differentiate to secrete IL-12 (which supports TH1 cell development) or IL-4 (which supports TH2 responses). pDNA injected by needle is endocytosed into the dendritic cell, which is then stimulated to differentiate for TH1 cytokine (IL-12) production, while the gene gun bombards the DNA directly into the cell, thus bypassing TH1 stimulation.

==== Practical uses of polarised T-cell help ====
Polarisation in T-cell help is useful in influencing allergic responses and autoimmune diseases. In autoimmune diseases, the goal is to shift the self-destructive TH1 response (with its associated cytotoxic T cell activity) to a non-destructive TH2 response. This has been successfully applied in predisease priming for the desired type of response in preclinical models and is somewhat successful in shifting the response for an established disease.

=== Cytotoxic T-cell responses ===
One of the advantages of DNA vaccines is that they are able to induce cytotoxic T lymphocytes (CTL) without the inherent risk associated with live vaccines. CTL responses can be raised against immunodominant and immunorecessive CTL epitopes, as well as subdominant CTL epitopes, in a manner that appears to mimic natural infection. This may prove to be a useful tool in assessing CTL epitopes and their role in providing immunity.

Cytotoxic T-cells recognise small peptides (8-10 amino acids) complexed to MHC class I molecules. These peptides are derived from cytosolic proteins that are degraded and delivered to the nascent MHC class I molecule within the endoplasmic reticulum (ER). Targeting gene products directly to the ER (by the addition of an ER insertion signal sequence at the N-terminus) should thus enhance CTL responses. This was successfully demonstrated using recombinant vaccinia viruses expressing influenza proteins, but the principle should also be applicable to DNA vaccines. Targeting antigens for intracellular degradation (and thus entry into the MHC class I pathway) by the addition of ubiquitin signal sequences, or mutation of other signal sequences, was shown to be effective at increasing CTL responses.

CTL responses can be enhanced by co-inoculation with co-stimulatory molecules such as B7-1 or B7-2 for DNA vaccines against influenza nucleoprotein, or GM-CSF for DNA vaccines against the murine malaria model P. yoelii. Co-inoculation with plasmids encoding co-stimulatory molecules IL-12 and TCA3 were shown to increase CTL activity against HIV-1 and influenza nucleoprotein antigens.

=== Humoral (antibody) response ===
Schematic diagram of an antibody and antigens

Antibody responses elicited by DNA vaccinations are influenced by multiple variables, including antigen type; antigen location (i.e. intracellular vs. secreted); number, frequency and immunization dose; site and method of antigen delivery.

==== Kinetics of antibody response ====
Humoral responses after a single DNA injection can be much longer-lived than after a single injection with a recombinant protein. Antibody responses against hepatitis B virus (HBV) envelope protein (HBsAg) have been sustained for up to 74 weeks without boost, while lifelong maintenance of protective response to influenza haemagglutinin was demonstrated in mice after gene gun delivery. Antibody-secreting cells (ASC) migrate to the bone marrow and spleen for long-term antibody production, and generally localise there after one year.

Comparisons of antibody responses generated by natural (viral) infection, immunization with recombinant protein and immunization with pDNA are summarised in Table 4. DNA-raised antibody responses rise much more slowly than when natural infection or recombinant protein immunization occurs. As many as 12 weeks may be required to reach peak titres in mice, although boosting can decrease the interval. This response is probably due to the low levels of antigen expressed over several weeks, which supports both primary and secondary phases of antibody response. DNA vaccine expressing HBV small and middle envelope protein was injected into adults with chronic hepatitis. The vaccine resulted in specific interferon gamma cell production. Also specific T-cells for middle envelop proteins antigens were developed. The immune response of the patients was not robust enough to control HBV infection

Table 4. Comparison of T-dependent antibody responses raise by DNA immunisations, protein inoculations and viral infections
	Method of Immunization		
	DNA vaccine	Recombinant protein	Natural infection
Amount of inducing antigen	ng	μg	? (ng-μg)
Duration of antigen presentation	several weeks	< 1 week	several weeks
Kinetics of antibody response	slow rise	rapid rise	rapid rise
Number of inoculations to obtain high avidity IgG and migration of ASC to bone marrow	one	two	one
Ab isotype (murine models)	C’-dependent or C’-independent	C’-dependent	C’-independent

Additionally, the titres of specific antibodies raised by DNA vaccination are lower than those obtained after vaccination with a recombinant protein. However, DNA immunization-induced antibodies show greater affinity to native epitopes than recombinant protein-induced antibodies. In other words, DNA immunization induces a qualitatively superior response. Antibodies can be induced after one vaccination with DNA, whereas recombinant protein vaccinations generally require a boost. DNA immunization can be used to bias the TH profile of the immune response and thus the antibody isotype, which is not possible with either natural infection or recombinant protein immunization. Antibody responses generated by DNA are useful as a preparative tool. For example, polyclonal and monoclonal antibodies can be generated for use as reagents.

== Mechanistic basis for DNA-raised immune responses ==
=== DNA uptake mechanism ===
When DNA uptake and subsequent expression was first demonstrated in vivo in muscle cells, these cells were thought to be unique because of their extensive network of T-tubules. Using electron microscopy, it was proposed that DNA uptake was facilitated by caveolae (or, non-clathrin coated pits). However, subsequent research revealed that other cells (such as keratinocytes, fibroblasts and epithelial Langerhans cells) could also internalize DNA. The mechanism of DNA uptake is not known.

Two theories dominate – that in vivo uptake of DNA occurs non-specifically, in a method similar to phago- or pinocytosis, or through specific receptors. These might include a 30kDa surface receptor, or macrophage scavenger receptors. The 30kDa surface receptor binds specifically to 4500-bp DNA fragments (which are then internalised) and is found on professional APCs and T-cells. Macrophage scavenger receptors bind to a variety of macromolecules, including polyribonucleotides and are thus candidates for DNA uptake. Receptor-mediated DNA uptake could be facilitated by the presence of polyguanylate sequences. Gene gun delivery systems, cationic liposome packaging, and other delivery methods bypass this entry method, but understanding it may be useful in reducing costs (e.g. by reducing the requirement for cytofectins), which could be important in animal husbandry.

=== Antigen presentation by bone marrow-derived cells ===
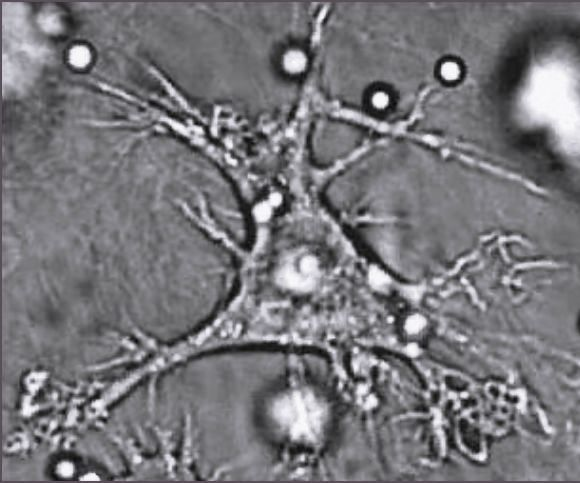
A dendritic cell

Studies using chimeric mice have shown that antigen is presented by bone-marrow derived cells, which include dendritic cells, macrophages and specialised B-cells called professional antigen presenting cells (APC). After gene gun inoculation to the skin, transfected Langerhans cells migrate to the draining lymph node to present antigens. After IM and ID injections, dendritic cells present antigen in the draining lymph node and transfected macrophages have been found in the peripheral blood.

Besides direct transfection of dendritic cells or macrophages, cross priming occurs following IM, ID and gene gun DNA deliveries. Cross-priming occurs when a bone marrow-derived cell presents peptides from proteins synthesised in another cell in the context of MHC class 1. This can prime cytotoxic T-cell responses and seems to be important for a full primary immune response.

=== Target site role ===
IM and ID DNA delivery initiate immune responses differently. In the skin, keratinocytes, fibroblasts and Langerhans cells take up and express antigens and are responsible for inducing a primary antibody response. Transfected Langerhans cells migrate out of the skin (within 12 hours) to the draining lymph node where they prime secondary B- and T-cell responses. In skeletal muscle, striated muscle cells are most frequently transfected, but seem to be unimportant in immune response. Instead, IM inoculated DNA "washes" into the draining lymph node within minutes, where distal dendritic cells are transfected and then initiate an immune response. Transfected myocytes seem to act as a "reservoir" of antigen for trafficking professional APCs.

=== Maintenance of immune response ===
DNA vaccination generates an effective immune memory via the display of antigen-antibody complexes on follicular dendritic cells (FDC), which are potent B-cell stimulators. T-cells can be stimulated by similar, germinal centre dendritic cells. FDC are able to generate an immune memory because antibodies production "overlaps" long-term expression of antigen, allowing antigen-antibody immunocomplexes to form and be displayed by FDC.

=== Interferons ===
Both helper and cytotoxic T-cells can control viral infections by secreting interferons. Cytotoxic T cells usually kill virally infected cells. However, they can also be stimulated to secrete antiviral cytokines such as IFN-γ and TNF-α, which do not kill the cell, but limit viral infection by down-regulating the expression of viral components. DNA vaccinations can be used to curb viral infections by non-destructive IFN-mediated control. This was demonstrated for hepatitis B. IFN-γ is critically important in controlling malaria infections and is a consideration for anti-malarial DNA vaccines.

== Immune response modulation ==
=== Cytokine modulation ===
An effective vaccine must induce an appropriate immune response for a given pathogen. DNA vaccines can polarise T-cell help towards TH1 or TH2 profiles and generate CTL and/or antibody when required. This can be accomplished by modifications to the form of antigen expressed (i.e. intracellular vs. secreted), the method and route of delivery or the dose. It can also be accomplished by the co-administration of plasmid DNA encoding immune regulatory molecules, i.e. cytokines, lymphokines or co-stimulatory molecules. These "genetic adjuvants" can be administered as a:

- mixture of 2 plasmids, one encoding the immunogen and the other encoding the cytokine
- single bi- or polycistronic vector, separated by spacer regions
- plasmid-encoded chimera, or fusion protein

In general, co-administration of pro-inflammatory agents (such as various interleukins, tumor necrosis factor, and GM-CSF) plus TH2-inducing cytokines increase antibody responses, whereas pro-inflammatory agents and TH1-inducing cytokines decrease humoral responses and increase cytotoxic responses (more important in viral protection). Co-stimulatory molecules such as B7-1, B7-2 and CD40L are sometimes used.

This concept was applied in topical administration of pDNA encoding IL-10. Plasmid encoding B7-1 (a ligand on APCs) successfully enhanced the immune response in tumour models. Mixing plasmids encoding GM-CSF and the circumsporozoite protein of P. yoelii (PyCSP) enhanced protection against subsequent challenge (whereas plasmid-encoded PyCSP alone did not). It was proposed that GM-CSF caused dendritic cells to present antigen more efficiently and enhance IL-2 production and TH cell activation, thus driving the increased immune response. This can be further enhanced by first priming with a pPyCSP and pGM-CSF mixture, followed by boosting with a recombinant poxvirus expressing PyCSP. However, co-injection of plasmids encoding GM-CSF (or IFN-γ, or IL-2) and a fusion protein of P. chabaudi merozoite surface protein 1 (C-terminus)-hepatitis B virus surface protein (PcMSP1-HBs) abolished protection against challenge, compared to protection acquired by delivery of pPcMSP1-HBs alone.

The advantages of genetic adjuvants are their low cost and simple administration, as well as avoidance of unstable recombinant cytokines and potentially toxic, "conventional" adjuvants (such as alum, calcium phosphate, monophosphoryl lipid A, cholera toxin, cationic and mannan-coated liposomes, QS21, carboxymethyl cellulose and ubenimex). However, the potential toxicity of prolonged cytokine expression is not established. In many commercially important animal species, cytokine genes have not been identified and isolated. In addition, various plasmid-encoded cytokines modulate the immune system differently according to the delivery time. For example, some cytokine plasmid DNAs are best delivered after immunogen pDNA, because pre- or co-delivery can decrease specific responses and increase non-specific responses.

=== Immunostimulatory CpG motifs ===
Plasmid DNA itself appears to have an adjuvant effect on the immune system. Bacterially derived DNA can trigger innate immune defence mechanisms, the activation of dendritic cells and the production of TH1 cytokines. This is due to recognition of certain CpG dinucleotide sequences that are immunostimulatory. CpG stimulatory (CpG-S) sequences occur twenty times more frequently in bacterially derived DNA than in eukaryotes. This is because eukaryotes exhibit "CpG suppression" – i.e. CpG dinucleotide pairs occur much less frequently than expected. Additionally, CpG-S sequences are hypomethylated. This occurs frequently in bacterial DNA, while CpG motifs occurring in eukaryotes are methylated at the cytosine nucleotide. In contrast, nucleotide sequences that inhibit the activation of an immune response (termed CpG neutralising, or CpG-N) are over represented in eukaryotic genomes. The optimal immunostimulatory sequence is an unmethylated CpG dinucleotide flanked by two 5’ purines and two 3’ pyrimidines. Additionally, flanking regions outside this immunostimulatory hexamer must be guanine-rich to ensure binding and uptake into target cells.

The innate system works with the adaptive immune system to mount a response against the DNA encoded protein. CpG-S sequences induce polyclonal B-cell activation and the upregulation of cytokine expression and secretion. Stimulated macrophages secrete IL-12, IL-18, TNF-α, IFN-α, IFN-β and IFN-γ, while stimulated B-cells secrete IL-6 and some IL-12.

Manipulation of CpG-S and CpG-N sequences in the plasmid backbone of DNA vaccines can ensure the success of the immune response to the encoded antigen and drive the immune response toward a TH1 phenotype. This is useful if a pathogen requires a TH response for protection. CpG-S sequences have also been used as external adjuvants for both DNA and recombinant protein vaccination with variable success rates. Other organisms with hypomethylated CpG motifs have demonstrated the stimulation of polyclonal B-cell expansion. The mechanism behind this may be more complicated than simple methylation – hypomethylated murine DNA has not been found to mount an immune response.

Most of the evidence for immunostimulatory CpG sequences comes from murine studies. Extrapolation of this data to other species requires caution – individual species may require different flanking sequences, as binding specificities of scavenger receptors vary across species. Additionally, species such as ruminants may be insensitive to immunostimulatory sequences due to their large gastrointestinal load.

=== Alternative boosts ===
DNA-primed immune responses can be boosted by the administration of recombinant protein or recombinant poxviruses. "Prime-boost" strategies with recombinant protein have successfully increased both neutralising antibody titre, and antibody avidity and persistence, for weak immunogens, such as HIV-1 envelope protein. Recombinant virus boosts have been shown to be very efficient at boosting DNA-primed CTL responses. Priming with DNA focuses the immune response on the required immunogen, while boosting with the recombinant virus provides a larger amount of expressed antigen, leading to a large increase in specific CTL responses.

Prime-boost strategies have been successful in inducing protection against malarial challenge in a number of studies. Primed mice with plasmid DNA encoding Plasmodium yoelii circumsporozoite surface protein (PyCSP), then boosted with a recombinant vaccinia virus expressing the same protein had significantly higher levels of antibody, CTL activity and IFN-γ, and hence higher levels of protection, than mice immunized and boosted with plasmid DNA alone. This can be further enhanced by priming with a mixture of plasmids encoding PyCSP and murine GM-CSF, before boosting with recombinant vaccinia virus. An effective prime-boost strategy for the simian malarial model P. knowlesi has also been demonstrated. Rhesus monkeys were primed with a multicomponent, multistage DNA vaccine encoding two liver-stage antigens – the circumsporozoite surface protein (PkCSP) and sporozoite surface protein 2 (PkSSP2) – and two blood stage antigens – the apical merozoite surface protein 1 (PkAMA1) and merozoite surface protein 1 (PkMSP1p42). They were then boosted with a recombinant canarypox virus encoding all four antigens (ALVAC-4). Immunized monkeys developed antibodies against sporozoites and infected erythrocytes, and IFN-γ-secreting T-cell responses against peptides from PkCSP. Partial protection against sporozoite challenge was achieved, and mean parasitemia was significantly reduced, compared to control monkeys. These models, while not ideal for extrapolation to P. falciparum in humans, will be important in pre-clinical trials.

=== Enhancing immune responses ===
==== DNA ====
The efficiency of DNA immunization can be improved by stabilising DNA against degradation, and increasing the efficiency of delivery of DNA into antigen-presenting cells. This has been demonstrated by coating biodegradable cationic microparticles (such as poly(lactide-co-glycolide) formulated with cetyltrimethylammonium bromide) with DNA. Such DNA-coated microparticles can be as effective at raising CTL as recombinant viruses, especially when mixed with alum. Particles 300 nm in diameter appear to be most efficient for uptake by antigen presenting cells.

==== Alphavirus vectors ====
Recombinant alphavirus-based vectors have been used to improve DNA vaccination efficiency. The gene encoding the antigen of interest is inserted into the alphavirus replicon, replacing structural genes but leaving non-structural replicase genes intact. The Sindbis virus and Semliki Forest virus have been used to build recombinant alphavirus replicons. Unlike conventional DNA vaccinations alphavirus vectors kill transfected cells and are only transiently expressed. Alphavirus replicase genes are expressed in addition to the vaccine insert. It is not clear how alphavirus replicons raise an immune response, but it may be due to the high levels of protein expressed by this vector, replicon-induced cytokine responses, or replicon-induced apoptosis leading to enhanced antigen uptake by dendritic cells.

== See also ==
- Vector DNA
- HIV vaccine
- Gene therapy
- mRNA vaccine
