= Plasmodium cyclopsi =

Scientific classification
- Domain: Eukaryota
- Clade: Sar
- Clade: Alveolata
- Phylum: Apicomplexa
- Class: Aconoidasida
- Order: Haemospororida
- Family: Plasmodiidae
- Genus: Plasmodium
- Species: P. cyclopsi

Binomial name
- Plasmodium cyclopsi Landau and Chabaud, 1978

Species of single-celled organism

Plasmodium cyclopsi is a parasite of the genus Plasmodium subgenus Vinckeia.

Like all Plasmodium species P. cyclopsi has both vertebrate and insect hosts. The vertebrate hosts for this parasite are mammals.

== Taxonomy ==
The parasite was first described by Landau and Chabaud in 1978.

== Distribution ==
This species was described in Gabon.

== Hosts ==
The only known host species for this parasite is the cyclops roundleaf bat (Hipposideros cyclops).
