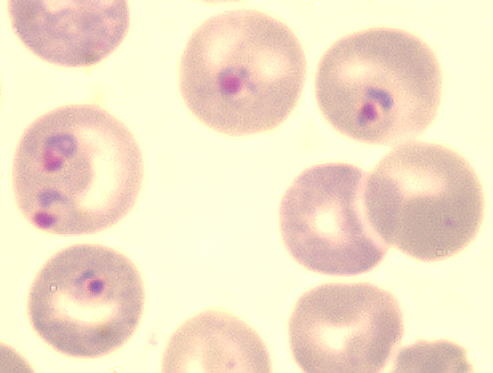
- Blood-borne forms

Scientific classification
- Domain: Eukaryota
- Clade: Sar
- Clade: Alveolata
- Phylum: Apicomplexa
- Class: Aconoidasida
- Order: Haemospororida
- Family: Plasmodiidae
- Genus: Plasmodium
- Species: P. berghei

Binomial name
- Plasmodium berghei Vincke & Lips, 1948

Strains
- ANKA; NK65

= Plasmodium berghei =

Single celled parasite, rodent malaria

Plasmodium berghei is a single-celled parasite causing rodent malaria. It is in the Plasmodium subgenus Vinckeia.

Originally, isolated from thicket rats in Central Africa, P. berghei is one of four Plasmodium species that have been described in African murine rodents, the others being P. chabaudi, P. vinckei, and P. yoelii. Due to its ability to infect rodents and relative ease of genetic engineering, P. berghei is a popular model organism for the study of human malaria.

== Biology ==
Like all malaria parasites of mammals, including the four human malaria parasites, P. berghei is transmitted by Anopheles mosquitoes and it infects the liver after being injected into the bloodstream by a bite of an infected female mosquito. After a short period (a few days) of development and multiplication, these parasites leave the liver and invade erythrocytes (red blood cells). The multiplication of the parasite in the blood causes the pathology such as anaemia and damage of essential organs of the host such as lungs, liver, spleen. P. berghei infections may also affect the brain and can be the cause of cerebral complications in laboratory mice (cerebral murine malaria, CMM). These symptoms are to a certain degree comparable to symptoms of cerebral malaria in patients infected with the human malaria parasite Plasmodium falciparum.

Although sexuality is necessary in vivo in P. berghei as normal for most sexual organisms, it is a stark competitive disadvantage in vitro. Sinha et al., 2014 implement both mechanical passaging and competitive assay to demonstrate the advantage of loss of gametocyte production: During mechanical passage successive generations are found to naturally trend toward lower gametocytaemia; and nonsexuals outcompete sexuals rapidly when placed together in vitro.

=== Immunochemistry ===
Endothelin 1 has an uncertain role in producing cerebral murine malaria. Martins et al., 2016 find blockade of endothelin-1 prevents CMM and its symptoms and supplementation helps to produce it. Subramaniam et al., 2015 find mice increase production of BTNL2 during infection and so it is probably protective. Chertow et al., 2015 find the asymmetric dimethylarginine-to-arginine ratio is indicative of disease severity in mice with P. berghei ANKA. This ratio is a metric of arginine bioavailability and in this disease they find it predicts degree of endothelial dysfunction.

=== Strains ===
Some strains produce cerebral murine malaria and some do not.

- ANKA produces CMM. Martins et al., 2016 find endothelin-1 production is vital to CMM disease progression. Subramaniam et al., 2015 find mice respond to ANKA by increasing BTNL2. Chertow et al., 2015 find arginine metabolism indicative of disease severity.
- NK65 notably does not produce CMM. Martins et al., 2016 find NK65 can produce CMM under supplementation of endothelin-1.

See section above for specific molecules' interactions.

== Distribution ==
Plasmodium berghei is found in the forests of Central Africa, where its natural cyclic hosts are the thicket rat (Grammomys surdaster) and the mosquito (Anopheles dureni).

== Hosts ==
Plasmodium berghei was first identified in the thicket rat (Grammomys surdaster). It has also been described in Leggada bella, Praomys jacksoni and Thamnomys surdaster. In research laboratories, various rodents can be infected, such as mice (Mus musculus), rats and gerbils (Meriones unguiculatus). In M. musculus ⇔ P. b. ANKA, downregulation of responses is necessary to prevent self-inflicted damage leading to CMM. Specifically, Sarfo et al., 2011 finds mice produce the cytokine interleukin-10 (cIL-10) to suppress otherwise-potentially-deadly CMM damage from others of their own immune factors.

The natural insect host of P. berghei is likely Anopheles dureni, however in laboratory conditions it has also been shown to infect An. stephensi.

=== Gene interactions ===
In Mus musculus ⇔ the P. b. ANKA strain various genes affect the incidence of cerebral murine malaria. Kassa et al., 2016 finds several genes to be of no effect:

- Apolipoprotein A-I (APOA1)
- Low density lipoprotein receptor (LDLR)
- Low density lipoprotein receptor-related protein 1 (LRP1)
- Very low density lipoprotein receptor (VLDLR)

They find one improves survival probability:

- Apolipoprotein E (APOE)

An. gambiae's hemocytes transcribe a wide array of molecular responses to Plasmodium infections. In response to this species, Baton et al., 2009 find this includes increased expression of the prophenoloxidase gene, cascading to increase phenoloxidase and thereby melanization.

== Treatment ==
Some phytochemicals show efficacy against P. berghei. Bankole et al., 2016 find Markhamia tomentosa to be highly effective, comparable to chloroquine, while Monoon longifolium is also significantly effective. They find Trichilia heudelotii to be ineffective.

TMEM33 is an endoplasmic reticulum localized protein that is essential for all life cycle stages of Plasmodium berghei. It is an important regulator of intracellular calcium homeostasis. In humans and other eukaryotes, TMEM33 is a stress-inducible ER transmembrane protein, and is the regulator of UPR response elements. UPR regulators and ER stress response elements play an important role in the blood stage infection and mosquito transmission of Plasmodium berghei. Targeted deletions of TMEM33 show reduced parasitemia and mortality, indicating its potential as a drug target.

The autophagy-related genes of Plasmodium berghei, PbATG5, PbATG8, and PbATG12 respond to 5-fluorouracil and chloroquine treatment, resulting in their upregulation and leading to apoptosis.

== History ==
This species was first described by Vincke and Lips in 1948 in the Belgian Congo.

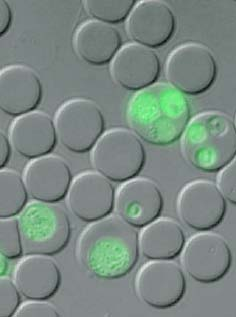
Live P. berghei expressing GFP (green) in erythrocytes; visualised using a fluorescence microscope

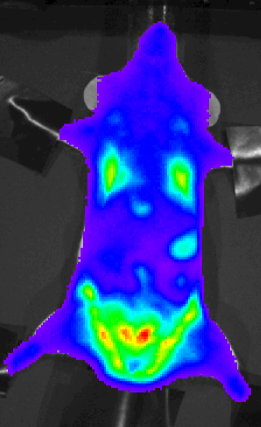
Infected mouse, with P. berghei in the lungs, spleen and adipose tissue. Transgenic parasites are visualized by their expression of the bioluminescent reporter protein Luciferase

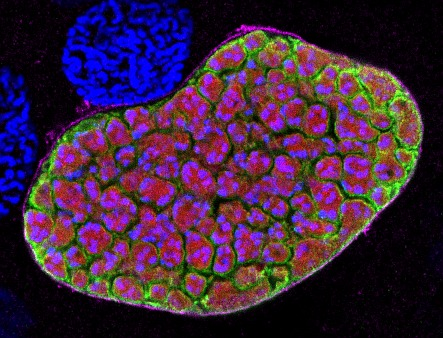
A liver cell with P. berghei (a schizont with daughter parasites) expressing mCherry (red). Here the parasite membrane is stained green with an antibody, while the nuclei of liver cells and parasites are stained with DAPI (blue)

== Research ==
Plasmodium berghei infection of laboratory mouse strains is frequently used in research as a model for human malaria. In the laboratory the natural hosts have been replaced by a number of commercially available laboratory mouse strains, and the mosquito Anopheles stephensi, which is comparatively easily reared and maintained under defined laboratory conditions.

P. berghei is used as a model organism for the investigation of human malaria because of its similarity to the Plasmodium species which cause human malaria. P. berghei has a very similar life-cycle to the species that infect humans, and it causes disease in mice which has signs similar to those seen in human malaria. Importantly, P. berghei can be genetically manipulated more easily than the species which infect humans, making it a useful model for research into Plasmodium genetics.

In several aspects the pathology caused by P. berghei in mice differs from malaria caused by P. falciparum in humans. In particular, while death from P. falciparum malaria in humans is most frequently caused by the accumulation of red blood cells in the blood vessels of the brain, it is unclear to what extent this occurs in mice infected with P. berghei. Instead, in P. berghei infection, mice are found to have an accumulation of immune cells in brain blood vessels. This has led some to question the use of P. berghei infections in mice as an appropriate model of cerebral malaria in humans.

P. berghei can be genetically manipulated in the laboratory using standard genetic engineering technologies. Consequently, this parasite is often used for the analysis of the function of malaria genes using the technology of genetic modification. Additionally, the genome of P. berghei has been sequenced and it shows a high similarity, both in structure and gene content, with the genome of the primate malaria parasite Plasmodium falciparum.

A number of genetically modified P. berghei lines have been generated which express fluorescent reporter proteins such as Green Fluorescent Protein (GFP) and mCherry (red) or bioluminescent reporters such as Luciferase. These transgenic parasites are important tools to study and visualize the parasites in the living host.

P. berghei is used in research programs for development and screening of anti-malarial drugs and for the development of an effective vaccine against malaria.
