= Plasmodium atheruri =

Scientific classification
- Domain: Eukaryota
- Clade: Sar
- Clade: Alveolata
- Phylum: Apicomplexa
- Class: Aconoidasida
- Order: Haemospororida
- Family: Plasmodiidae
- Genus: Plasmodium
- Species: P. atheruri

Binomial name
- Plasmodium atheruri den Berghe, Peel, Chardome and Lambrecht, 1958

Species of single-celled organism

Plasmodium atheruri is a species of the genus Plasmodium subgenus Vinckeia. As in all members of this genus, it is parasitic on vertebrate and insect hosts. The natural vertebrate host is the African porcupine (Atherurus africanus) but it is possible to infect the large vesper mouse (Calomys callosus) and Meriones unguiculatus.

== Taxonomy ==
This species was described in 1958 by den Berghe, Peel, Chardome and Lambrecht.

== Vectors ==
- Anopheles machardyi
- Anopheles smithii
- Anopheles stephensi

== Distribution ==
This species is found in Africa.
