= Plasmodium osmaniae =

Scientific classification
- Domain: Eukaryota
- Clade: Diaphoretickes
- Clade: SAR
- Clade: Alveolata
- Phylum: Apicomplexa
- Class: Aconoidasida
- Order: Haemospororida
- Family: Plasmodiidae
- Genus: Plasmodium
- Species: P. osmaniae

Binomial name
- Plasmodium osmaniae Shortt, Rao, Qadri and Abraham, 1961

Species of single-celled organism

Plasmodium osmaniae is a parasite of the genus Plasmodium subgenus Vinckeia.

Like all Plasmodium species P. osmaniae has both vertebrate and insect hosts. The vertebrate hosts for this parasite are mammals.

== Description ==
The parasite was first described by Shortt in 1961. It was renamed Plasmodium shortii by Bray in 1963 and still later this species was then reclassified as Plasmodium inui.
