= Plasmodium girardi =

Scientific classification
- Domain: Eukaryota
- Clade: Sar
- Clade: Alveolata
- Phylum: Apicomplexa
- Class: Aconoidasida
- Order: Haemospororida
- Family: Plasmodiidae
- Genus: Plasmodium
- Species: P. girardi

Binomial name
- Plasmodium girardi Buck, Coudurier and Quesnel, 1952

Lemur parasite causing malaria

Plasmodium girardi is a malaria parasite affecting lemurs. It was described in Madagascar in 1951 in Eulemur rufus, the red-fronted lemur. It is named after Georges Girard, head of the Institut Pasteur in Antananarivo. It is one of four Plasmodium species described in lemurs before 1975; others were Plasmodium foleyi and Plasmodium lemuris.
