= Irène Landau =

French parasitologist

Irène Landau is a French parasitologist and professor emeritus at the National Museum of Natural History, France (MNHN) and Centre national de la recherche scientifique.

Landau initially studied medicine, obtaining her medical qualifications in Paris in 1958 and a certificate in tropical medicine in 1963. She changed to focus on parasitology research, joining the lab of Lucien Brumpt in 1964 as a research assistant, and a year later relocating to Alain Chabaud's group at the MNHN. She was promoted in 1966 to senior lecturer and made group head of studying the Plasmodium genus. She briefly worked in London in the 1960s in the group of Cyril Garnham at the London School of Hygiene & Tropical Medicine, where she met and begun collaborating with Wallace Peters and Robert Killick-Kendrick. During a research trip to the Central African Republic in 1964/5 Landau isolated and described the rodent malaria parasite Plasmodium chabaudi (naming it after her supervisor) from local Thamnomys rutilans thicket rats. She brought these samples with her to London, and together with Killick-Kendrich they isolated and identified another new rodent malaria species. The species was similar to Plasmodium berghei, and it was named Plasmodium yoelii in homage to the malarial researcher Meir Yoeli. To this day both species are used extensively in malaria research. Peters, Landau and Killick-Kendrick styled themselves as the 'plasmodiacs'.

When visiting Elizabeth U Canning at Silwood Park in the 1970s she snuck a royal python over to England on her flight. The snake was reportedly kept as a pet in the department for many years. Also in the 1970s, Landau visited the Wellcome Parasitology Institute in Belém to study the recently discovered Saurocytozoons with Ralph Lainson. It was after the respected British parasitologist that Landau later named the Lankesterellidae genus Lainsonia.

She submitted her PhD thesis in 1972, entitled 'La diversité des mecanismes assurant la perennite de l'infection chez les sporozoaires coccidiomorphes [The variety of mechanisms that ensure the persistence of infection in coccidiomorphic sporozoites'. She advanced to co-director of the lab in 1987 before becoming full director of the lab of protozoology and comparative parasitology in 1989. In 1994 she was promoted to a full professor. Her and Chabaud were awarded the 1999 Émile Brumpt prize for their contributions to parasitology.

Landau has continued to work on Apicomplexa parasites into the present day. She recently published (in collaboration with Francisco J. Ayala, Gregory Karadjian and Linda Duval) a description of the jumbled mitochondrial genomes of Nycteria parasites (which infect Nycteridae bats), explaining why cytochrome b sequencing of the parasites has been unsuccessful.
