= Tetrameridae =

Scientific classification
- Kingdom: Animalia
- Phylum: Nematoda
- Class: Chromadorea
- Order: Rhabditida
- Superfamily: Habronematoidea
- Family: Tetrameridae; Travassos, 1914

Subfamilies and genera
- see text

Synonyms
- Tetrameridea von Drasche, 1884

Family of roundworms

Tetrameridae is a family of spirurian nematodes. It is the smallest of the large genera making up the bulk of the superfamily Habronematoidea. Like all nematodes, they have neither a circulatory nor a respiratory system. They are parasites, chiefly of birds and cetaceans.

This family contains the largest known nematode: Placentonema gigantissima is several meters long and has been found in the placenta of the sperm whale (Physeter macrocephalus).

== Systematics ==
The Tetrameridae number about half a dozen genera only, but some are rather speciose; the type genus Tetrameres contains a lot of species even by nematode standards. While it might be overlumped, as presently delimited about half of the more than 100 species of Tetrameridae are placed in it.

Subfamily Crassicaudinae Yorke & Maplestone, 1926

- Crassicauda Leiper & Atkinson, 1914
- Placentonema Gubanov, 1951

Subfamily Geopetitiinae Chabaud, 1951

- Geopetitia Chabaud, 1951 [Diagnostic; French, Todd, Zachary & Meehan 1992

Subfamily Tetramerinae Travassos, 1914

- Microhadjelia Jogis, 1965
- Microtetrameres Travassos, 1915
- Tetrameres Creplin, 1846
