= Plasmodium aegyptensis =

Scientific classification
- Domain: Eukaryota
- Clade: Sar
- Clade: Alveolata
- Phylum: Apicomplexa
- Class: Aconoidasida
- Order: Haemospororida
- Family: Plasmodiidae
- Genus: Plasmodium
- Species: P. aegyptensis

Binomial name
- Plasmodium aegyptensis Abd-el-Aziz et al., 1975

Species of single-celled organism

Plasmodium aegyptensis is a parasite of the genus Plasmodium subgenus Vinckeia which infects the Egyptian grass rat (Arvicanthis niloticus). The insect vector(s) for this species is not yet known.

== Description ==
This species was first described in 1975 by Abd-el-Aziz et al. in Assiut from a group of Egyptian grass rats which had been captured. The parasite has not been isolated from other Egyptian grass rats since. As such, only the parasite stages which infect red blood cells of the vertebrate host have been described.

When P. aegyptensis infects red blood cells in its mammalian host, it forms compact rings with a small food vacuole. Trophozoite forms are compact and rounded. Schizonts generally contain six merozoites (although 4 to 8 have been observed). When the parasites differentiate into gametocytes, these tend to occupy one pole of the cell, and they grow in size until larger than the uninfected red blood cells.

== Distribution ==
P. aegyptensis has only been described a single time in Assiut, Egypt.

== Vectors ==
The insect host of P. aegyptensis is not known.
