= Vinckeia =

Scientific classification
- Domain: Eukaryota
- Clade: Sar
- Clade: Alveolata
- Phylum: Apicomplexa
- Class: Aconoidasida
- Order: Haemospororida
- Family: Plasmodiidae
- Genus: Plasmodium
- Subgenus: Vinckeia

Subgenus of single-celled organisms

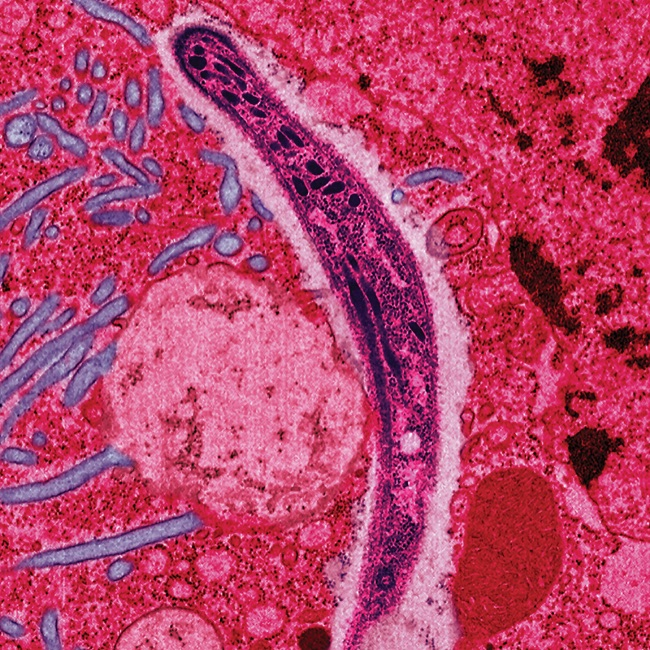

Vinckeia is a subgenus of the genus Plasmodium — all of which are parasitic alveolates. The subgenus Vinckeia was created by Cyril Garnham in 1964 to accommodate the mammalian parasites other than those infecting the primates.

== Diagnostic features ==
Species in this subgenus infect mammals other than the higher primates. Species infecting lemurs have since been included in this subgenus. This classification may not be correct.

Schizonts: These do not fill the erythrocyte and do not show true stippling. They give rise normally to 8 or fewer merozoites. Schizogony normally takes three days or less.

Merozoites:

Gametocytes: These are spherical.

== Species in this subgenus ==
The following is a list of species in subgenus Vinckeia and their hosts.

- Plasmodium achromaticum — insectivorous bat species
- Plasmodium aegyptensis — African grass rat (Arvicanthis niloticus)
- Plasmodium anomaluri — African flying squirrel (Anomalurus species)
- Plasmodium atheruri — African brush-tailed porcupine (Atherurus africanus), Large vesper mouse (Calomys callosus) and Mongolian gerbil (Meriones unguiculatus), Anopheles stephensi
- Plasmodium berghei — the African woodland thicket rat (Grammomys surdaster), Anopheles stephensi
- Plasmodium booliati — the Malayan giant flying squirrel Petaurista petaurista
- Plasmodium bouillize
- Plasmodium brodeni — four-toed elephant shrews (Petrodromus tetradactylus)
- Plasmodium bubalis — water buffaloes (Bubalus bubalis)
- Plasmodium bucki
- Plasmodium caprae — domestic goat (Capra hircus)
- Plasmodium cephalophi — the antelope (Cephalophus grimmi) and the common duiker/grey duiker (Sylvicapra grimmia)
- Plasmodium cercopitheci
- Plasmodium chabaudi — Anopheles stephensi
- Plasmodium coulangesi
- Plasmodium cyclopsi — the Cyclops roundleaf bat (Hipposideros cyclops)
- Plasmodium foleyi
- Plasmodium girardi
- Plasmodium incertae — flying squirrel
- Plasmodium inopinatum
- Plasmodium joyeuxi
- Plasmodium landauae — African flying squirrels (Anomalurus species)
- Plasmodium lemuris
- Plasmodium melanipherum — the common bent-wing bat/Schreibers' bat (Miniopterus schreibersii)
- Plasmodium narayani
- Plasmodium odocoilei — white-tailed deer (Odocoileus virginianus)
- Plasmodium percygarnhami
- Plasmodium pulmophilium — African flying squirrel (Anomalurus species)
- Plasmodium sandoshami — the Sunda flying lemur (Galeopterus variegatus)
- Plasmodium semnopitheci
- Plasmodium traguli — mouse deer
- Plasmodium tyrio — the Chinese pangolin (Manis pentadactyla)
- Plasmodium uilenbergi
- Plasmodium vinckei – rodents
- Plasmodium voltaicum — the Angolan rousette (a fruit bat, Myonycteris angolensis/Rousettus smithi)
- Plasmodium watteni — Formosan giant flying squirrel (Petaurista petaurista grandis)
- Plasmodium yoelii — Anopheles stephensi

== Evolutionary history ==
Sharp et al 2020 reanalyze the available amino acid substitution data and conclude that chabaudi, yoelii, and berghei cluster relatively close together. Further they find chabaudi split off first and the berghei/yoelii division is more recent.

== By host ==
=== Murine malaria ===
Murine malaria – malaria in mice – is caused by P. berghei, P. chabaudi, P. vinckei and P. yoelii. Some strains produce cerebral malaria and some do not.
