= Plasmodium molecular tools =

Plasmodium molecular tools are a set of methods for the genetic manipulation of the parasite genus Plasmodium. Plasmodium species have been difficult to scientifically study, partially due to the inability of many standard biological techniques to genetically alter the organism. Recent research has sought to overcome these technical barriers in order to make the parasite more amenable to study. Below is a description of published methods of genetic control within the Plasmodium parasite.

== Transformation ==
- Electroporation
- loaded RBCs

== DNA level ==
=== Transcription regulation ===
- Tet-based transactivator system - ligand-inducible control of gene transcription based upon the Tet system (P. falciparum)

=== Integration systems ===
- Rep20 mediated
- Bxb1 integrase - site-specific stable genetic integration into chromosomes mediated by mycobacteriophage Bxb1 integrase (P. falciparum)

=== Recombination systems ===
- Flp/FRT - induced site-specific recombination/mutagenesis using the yeast Flp/FRT system (P. berghei)

=== Transposon systems ===
- piggyBac - lepidopteran transposable element for random, efficient integration of DNA into genome (P. falciparum)

== RNA level ==
- RNAi
- antisense
- self-cleaving ribozyme - A failed attempt to use an inducible self-cleaving ribozyme to control mRNA degradation of fused transcripts (P. falciparum)

== Protein level ==
- FKBP destabilization domain - ligand (Shld1)-regulatable domain to promote degradation of fusion protein (P. falciparum)
- DHFR destabilization domain - ligand (Trimethoprim)-regulatable domain to promote degradation of fusion protein P. falciparum. By virtue of protein being tagged to a DHFR degradation domain from E. coli, as well as GFP and an HA-tag, protein levels can be regulated, cellular localization of the protein can be determined, and the protein can be purified from cultured parasites.
