= Yoeli =

Yoeli is both a given name and surname. Notable people with the name include:

- Yoeli Childs (born 1998), American basketball player
- Meir Yoeli (1912–1975), Lithuanian biologist
- Rafi Yoeli (born c. 1950), Israeli pilot
