= Plasmodium vinckei =

Scientific classification
- Domain: Eukaryota
- Clade: Sar
- Clade: Alveolata
- Phylum: Apicomplexa
- Class: Aconoidasida
- Order: Haemospororida
- Family: Plasmodiidae
- Genus: Plasmodium
- Species: P. vinckei

Binomial name
- Plasmodium vinckei Rodhain, 1952

Species of single-celled organism

Plasmodium vinckei is a parasite of the genus Plasmodium subgenus Vinckeia. As in all Plasmodium species, P. vinckei has both vertebrate and insect hosts. The vertebrate hosts for this parasite are rodents.

== Taxonomy ==
This species was first described in 1952 by Rodhain. Several subspecies have been described since.

=== Subspecies ===
- Plasmodium vinckei. brucechwatti
- Plasmodium vinckei chabaudi
- Plasmodium vinckei lentum
- Plasmodium vinckei petteri
- Plasmodium vinckei vinckei

== Distribution ==
This species is found in Central Africa including the Democratic Republic of the Congo and Nigeria.

== Vectors ==
- Anopheles cinctus
- Anopheles dureni
