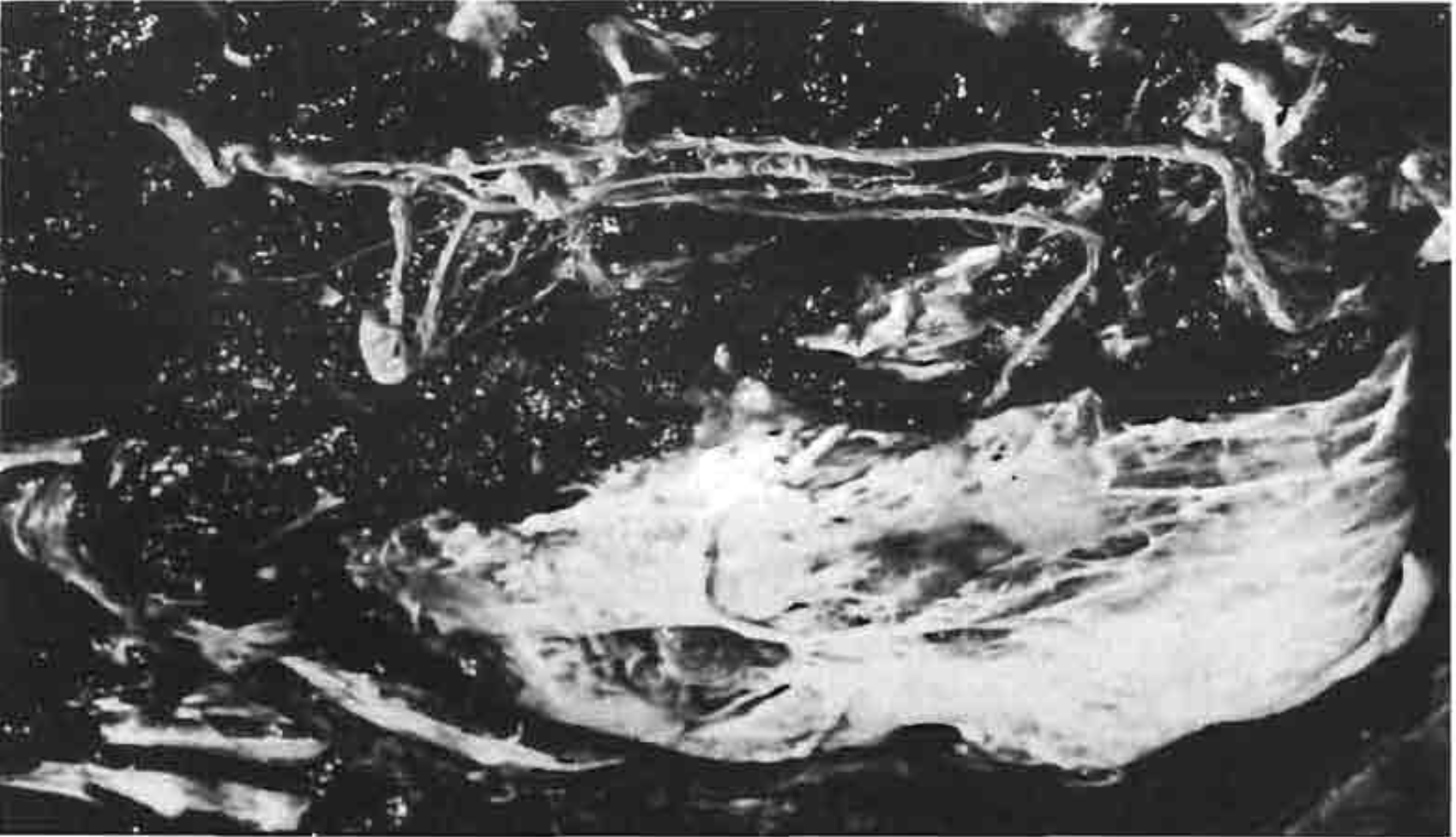
- Placentonema gigantissima in the placenta of a sperm whale (Physeter macrocephalus)

Scientific classification
- Kingdom: Animalia
- Phylum: Nematoda
- Class: Chromadorea
- Order: Rhabditida
- Family: Tetrameridae
- Genus: Placentonema
- Species: P. gigantissima

Binomial name
- Placentonema gigantissima (Gubanov, 1951)

= Placentonema gigantissima =

Species of roundworm

Placentonema gigantissima is a giant nematode that parasitizes the placenta and other tissues of the sperm whale. With a length of 8.4 metres (28 ft) and a diameter of 2.5 centimetres (0.98 in), it is potentially the largest nematode worm ever described, inhabiting one of the largest mammals in the world. It was discovered in the 1950s around the Kuril Islands.

== Taxonomy ==
Placentonema gigantissima was described in 1951 by Russian parasitologist and helminthologist Nikolai Mikhailovich Gubanov.

Originally described from the family Crassicaudidae, it is now classified in the subfamily Crassicaudinae of the roundworm family Tetrameridae.

It is a monotypic genus that differs from the only other genus in the subfamily, Crassicauda, by its "caudal alae, stub-like papillae and multiple uterus branching into 32 uteri".

== Description ==
The body is very long, cylindrical, tapering at the ends, with a transparent cuticle. The oral orifice is oval shaped with two simple lateral lips, while the esophagus is divided into two parts, one muscular and glandular.

Males are up to 3.75 m long and 9 mm wide; females up to 8.4 m long and 2.5 cm wide, with up to 32 ovaries. Mature eggs are oval, 0.05 mm long by 0.03 mm wide, and the young inside the eggs are completely formed.

== Life cycle ==
Placentonema gigantissima utilizes nutrients found in the endometrium of female sperm whales. It forms spiriud (small, embryonated) eggs.

It can parasitize not only the placenta, but also the uterus, reproductive tract, mammary glands, and subdermis of the sperm whale. It is commonly found in pregnant sperm whales.

Much of the life cycle of P. gigantissima is unknown.

== Distribution ==
This species is found inside female sperm whales that inhabit lower latitudes of the southern hemisphere.
