= Plasmodium foleyi =

Scientific classification
- Domain: Eukaryota
- Clade: Sar
- Clade: Alveolata
- Phylum: Apicomplexa
- Class: Aconoidasida
- Order: Haemospororida
- Family: Plasmodiidae
- Genus: Plasmodium
- Species: P. foleyi

Binomial name
- Plasmodium foleyi Buck, Coudurier and Quesnel, 1952

Species of single-celled organism

Plasmodium foleyi is a parasite of the genus Plasmodium subgenus Vinckeia. As in all Plasmodium species, P. foleyi has both vertebrate and insect hosts. The vertebrate hosts for this parasite are mammals.

== Description ==
This species was described by Buck, Coudurier and Quesnel in 1952. Its description was amended by Garnham and Uilenbe.

It was discovered in a splenectomised Lemur fulvus rufus in 1951 and it is named after Dr. H. Foley of the Pasteur Institute of Algeria.

The infected erythrocyte becomes enlarged.

== Distribution ==
This species is found in Madagascar.

== Hosts ==
The only known host is the lemur Lemur fulvus rufus.
