= Tetrameres =

Scientific classification
- Kingdom: Animalia
- Phylum: Nematoda
- Class: Chromadorea
- Order: Rhabditida
- Family: Tetrameridae
- Genus: Tetrameres; Creplin, 1846

Genus of roundworms

Tetrameres is a genus of nematodes belonging to the family Tetrameridae.

Species:

- Tetrameres fissispina (Diesing, 1861)
- Tetrameres salina (Núñez, Drago, Digiani & Lunaschi, 2017)
- Tetrameres tarapungae (Clark, 1978)
