= Plasmodium lemuris =

Scientific classification
- Domain: Eukaryota
- Clade: Sar
- Clade: Alveolata
- Phylum: Apicomplexa
- Class: Aconoidasida
- Order: Haemospororida
- Family: Plasmodiidae
- Genus: Plasmodium
- Species: P. lemuris

Binomial name
- Plasmodium lemuris Huff and Hoogstraal, 1963

Species of single-celled organism

Plasmodium lemuris is a parasite of the genus Plasmodium subgenus Vinckeia.

Like all Plasmodium species P. lemuris has both vertebrate and insect hosts. The vertebrate hosts for this parasite are mammals.

== Taxonomy ==
This species was first described by Huff and Hoogstraal in 1963 in the black lemur Lemur collaris. This species may belong to the genus Haemoproteus rather than to Plasmodium. Clarification of this point awaits examination of the organism's DNA.

== Distribution ==
This species is found in Madagascar.

== Hosts ==
The known hosts include the lemurs Lemur macaco macaco and Lemur collaris.

The infected erythrocyte is enlarged (+/- 10 micrometres) and distorted in shape and in many instances is almost completely filled by the parasite.

Young trophozoites are small and occupy three-tenths to four-tenths of the erythrocytes. The nucleus stains rose-red. Larger trophozoites are more irregular tending toward amoeboidity.

Pigment is in granules and there is no stippling of the host cell.

The schizonts display irregularly shaped nuclei. The pigment is brown and clumped into a diffused mass.

The gametocytes are very large (11×7 micrometres) and irregular in shape. Their nuclei are band-like or lobed irregularly.

The macrogametocytes have lavender to purple cytoplasm. The pigment is made up of small dark brown granules within vacuoles.

The microgametocytes have red-staining nuclei and slate-gray cytoplasm. Their pigment is similar to that of the macrogametocytes.
