= Plasmodium RUF6 RNA =

Plasmodium RNA of unknown function 6
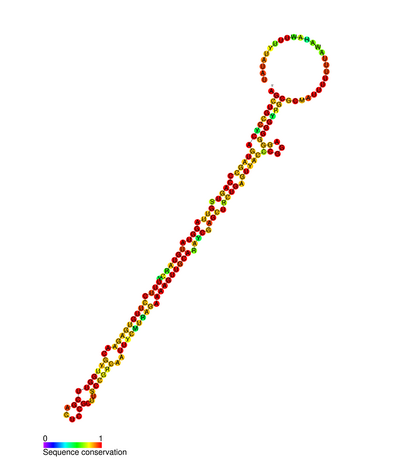
- Predicted secondary structure of RUF6

Identifiers
- Symbol: RUF6
- Rfam: RF01581

Other data
- RNA type: sRNA
- Domain: Plasmodium
- PDB structures: PDBe

RUF6 is a non-coding RNA (ncRNA) present within the plasmodium genome. Bioinformatic studies predicted that RUF6 was present within the plasmodium genome and the expression of this ncRNA was verified by Northern Blot. The location of this ncRNAs was subsequently mapped within the P. falciparum strain 3DF genome by primer extension. This ncRNA was shown to be encoded for by multiple genes that are clustered together within the plasmodium genome. These clusters were located in regions that flanked the malaria surface antigens RIFIN and VAR genes or in locations that are known for being recombination hot spots. The function of RUF6 is still unknown but from knowing the location of RUF6 within the plasmodium genome it has been suggested that RUF6 may have a role in the expression or maintenance of the malaria surface antigens but this has yet to be determined.
