= Plasmodium chabaudi =

Scientific classification
- Domain: Eukaryota
- Clade: Sar
- Clade: Alveolata
- Phylum: Apicomplexa
- Class: Aconoidasida
- Order: Haemospororida
- Family: Plasmodiidae
- Genus: Plasmodium
- Subgenus: Vinckeia
- Species: P. chabaudi

Binomial name
- Plasmodium chabaudi Landau, 1965

Subspecies
- Plasmodium chabaudi adami; Plasmodium chabaudi chabaudi

Species of single-celled organism

Plasmodium chabaudi is a parasite of the genus Plasmodium subgenus Vinckeia. As in all Plasmodium species, P. chabaudi has both vertebrate and insect hosts. The vertebrate hosts for this parasite are rodents.

== Taxonomy ==
This species was described in 1965 by Irène Landau. It is named after the French parasitologist Alain Chabaud.

=== Subspecies ===
Two subspecies have been defined: P. chabaudi chabaudi and P. chabaudi adami.

== Genome ==
The nuclear genome is 18.8 megabases in size with a karyotype of 14 chromosomes. The G+C content is ~23%. A genome sequencing project is underway.

== Distribution ==
Plasmodium chabaudi is found in Africa. It was first isolated from the blood of a shining thicket rat (Thamnomys rutilans) in the Central African Republic.

== Hosts ==
While it is difficult to study P. chabaudi in its natural host given the difficulty of taming the thicket rat, it has been studied extensively in laboratory mice, largely using the clone P. chabaudi chabaudi (AS). The pathology resembles that of human malaria in that animals are susceptible to parasite growth and pathology such as anemia, hypoglycemia, changes in body temperature, weight loss, and occasional death. The other cloned strains vary in growth rates and virulence. One unique feature of this species is its prolonged course of infection. While it seems to persist for years in the thicket rat, P. chabaudi (AS) lasts up to three months in BALB/c or C57Bl/6 mice P. falciparum has been observed to persist for up to a year, and even in conditions of drought when there are no new infections. Other species that are used to model human infection do not have this property. The other unique properties of this parasite are that it is synchronous, as first described for malaria by Galen, and that it prefers to infect normocytes, similar to P. falciparum, the most virulent human parasite, while several of the other rodent parasites have a preference for immature red blood cells, or reticulocytes, which they share with P. vivax.

In Anopheles stephensi the parasite synchronizes its circadian and diurnal rhythms with the host's. Schneider et al., 2018 finds P. chabaudi is selected to take advantage of the cycles of feeding and lowered immunity of the mosquito. They did not find any evidence for such a pattern in Mus musculus, testing for migration to peripheral vessels and finding none. This parasite/mosquito synchronization is believed to hold for malaria parasites in general.

=== Host resistance ===
Peak parasitaemia in Thamnomys rutilans – the natural host – is still unknown as of 2004. Landau 1965 and 66 did however find them to suffer to some severe degree, as did Ellerman 1940 in the sympatric and genetically close Grammomys surdaster. The peak is known to be 30% (10^{9}/ml) for laboratory mice from many studies, including Jarra and Brown 1985. For specifically resistant breeds like C57Bl/6J Stevenson et al., 1982 finds the mortality is 5-20%, while for those known not to be resistant such as CBA/Ca and Dilute, Brown and non-Agouti (DBA), they find much higher mortalities.

== Lifecycle ==
There is usually a high female-to-male ratio in mature infections but this inhibits transmission at low densities due to lack of any male partner at the beginning of a new infection. Therefore Reece et al., 2008 find P. chabaudi will bias toward a more even ratio at lower densities and when several clonal lineages are competing with each other in the same host. This is believed to generalize beyond this species, to all Plasmodium.

== Therapeutic uses ==
Plasmodium chabaudi can reduce autoimmunity. Zinger et al., 2003 deliberately infected mice with the parasite and found reduced symptoms of autoimmunity.
