= Immunodominance =

Immunodominance is the immunological phenomenon in which immune responses are mounted against only a few of the antigenic peptides out of the many produced. That is, despite multiple allelic variations of MHC molecules and multiple peptides presented on antigen presenting cells, the immune response is skewed to only specific combinations of the two. Immunodominance is evident for both antibody-mediated immunity and cell-mediated immunity. Epitopes that are not targeted or targeted to a lower degree during an immune response are known as subdominant epitopes. The impact of immunodominance is immunodomination, where immunodominant epitopes will curtail immune responses against non-dominant epitopes. Antigen-presenting cells such as dendritic cells, can have up to six different types of MHC molecules for antigen presentation. There is a potential for generation of hundreds to thousands of different peptides from the proteins of pathogens. Yet, the effector cell population that is reactive against the pathogen is dominated by cells that recognize only a certain class of MHC bound to only certain pathogen-derived peptides presented by that MHC class. Antigens from a particular pathogen can be of variable immunogenicity, with the antigen that stimulates the strongest response being the immunodominant one. The different levels of immunogenicity amongst antigens forms what is known as dominance hierarchy.

== Mechanism ==
=== CTL immunodominance ===
The mechanisms of immunodominance are very poorly understood. What determines cytotoxic T lymphocyte (CTL) immunodominance can be a number of factors, many of which are debated. Of these, one in particular focuses on the timing of CTL clonal expansion. The dominant CTLs that arise were activated sooner so therefore proliferate faster than subdominant CTLs that were activated later, thus resulting in a greater number of CTLs for that immunodominant epitope. This can be in concordance with an additional theory which states that immunodominance may be dependent on the affinity of the T-cell receptor (TCR) to the immunodominant epitope. That is, T cells with a TCR that has high affinity for its antigen are most likely to be immunodominant. High affinity of the peptide to the TCR contributes to the T cell’s survival and proliferation, allowing for more clonal selection of the immunodominant T cells over the subdominant T cells. Immunodominant T cells also curtail subdominant T cells by outcompeting them for cytokine sources from antigen-presenting cells. This leads to a greater expansion of the T cells that recognize a high affinity epitope and is favored since these cells are likely to clear the infection much more quickly and effectively than their subdominant counterparts. Immunodominance is a relative term. If subdominant epitopes are introduced without the dominant epitope, the immune response will be focused to that subdominant epitope. Meanwhile, if the dominant epitope is introduced with the subdominant epitope, the immune response will be directed against the dominant epitope while silencing the response against the subdominant epitope.

=== Antibody immunodominance ===
The mechanism of immunodominance in B cell activation focuses on the affinity of epitope binding to the B-cell receptor (BCR). If an epitope binds very strongly to a B cell BCR, it will then subsequently bind with high affinity to the resultant antibodies produced by that B cell upon activation. These antibodies then out-compete the BCR for the epitope, and thus that B cell lineage will be unavailable for subsequent stimulation. On the opposite end of the scale where BCRs have low affinity for the epitopes, these B cells are outcompeted for stimulation by B cells with BCRs that have higher affinities for their respective epitopes. Insufficient T cell stimulation by these B cells also leads to suppression of these B cells by the T cells. The immunodominant epitope will be a BCR that has a particular ‘goldilocks’ amount of affinity for its epitope determined by equilibrium binding affinity. This leads to initial IgM response directed at the strongly binding epitope, and the subsequent IgG response focused on the immunodominant epitope. That is, those within the ‘goldilocks zone’ for affinity will be available for subsequent T helper stimulation, allowing for class switching, affinity maturation and thus, resulting in immunodominance to that particular epitope.

== Implications ==
Having the immune response focused on a specific immunodominant epitope is useful because it allows the strongest immune response against a certain pathogen to dominate, thus eliminating the pathogen fast and effectively. However, it can also cause a hindrance because of potential pathogen escape. In the case of HIV, immunodominance can be unfavorable because of the high mutation rate of HIV. The immunodominant epitope can be mutated in the virus, thus allowing HIV to avoid the adaptive immune response when reintroduced from latency. This is why the disease perpetuates, as the virus mutates to avoid the antibodies and T cells specific for the immunodominant epitope that is no longer expressed by the virus. Immunodominance can also have implications in cancer immunotherapy. Similar to HIV-escape, cancer can escape the immune system’s detection by antigenic variation. As the immunodominant epitope is mutated and/or lost in the cancer, the immune response no longer has Immunodominance also has implications in vaccine development. Immunodominant epitopes vary from person to person. This phenomenon is due to the variability of HLA types, which make up the MHC molecules that present the immunodominant epitopes. Therefore, people with different alleles may respond to different epitopes of the same pathogen. With vaccine development particularly for subunit-based and recombinant vaccines, this may lead to some individuals which have different HLA haplotype to not respond while others do.
