= Alain Chabaud =

French parasitologist (1923–2013)

Alain G. Chabaud
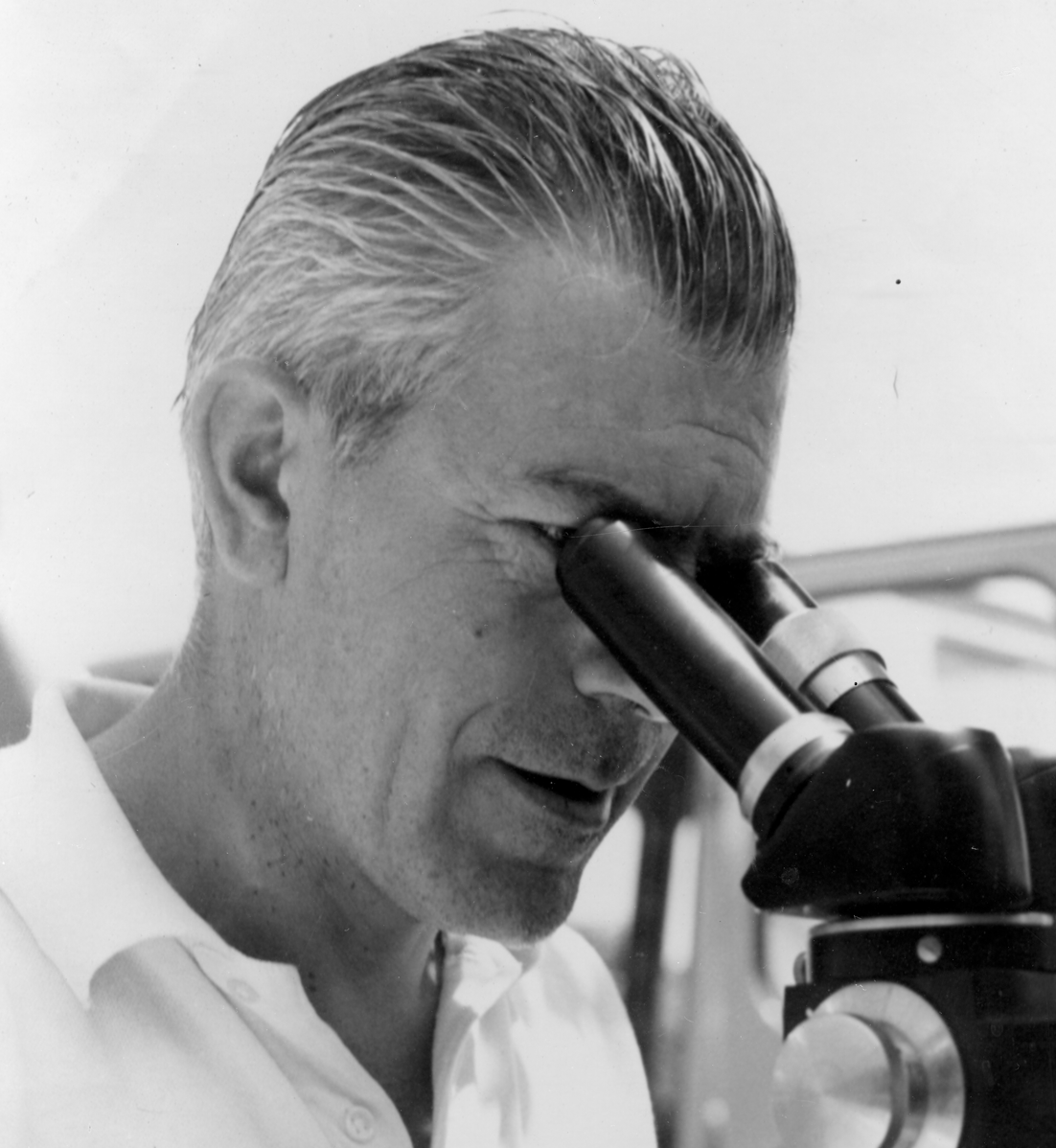
- Alain Chabaud in 1968
- Born: 13 March 1923; L'Aigle, France
- Died: 11 March 2013 (aged 89); Chevilly-Larue
- Scientific career
- Fields: Parasitology
- Institutions: Muséum National d'Histoire Naturelle, Paris

Alain Chabaud (13 March 1923 – 11 March 2013) was a French parasitologist, mainly a specialist of nematodes and sporozoa. He was the Director of the Laboratoire de Zoologie (Vers) in the Muséum National d'Histoire Naturelle in Paris from 1960 to 1989. He was one of the founders of the Société Française de Parasitologie in 1962 and its president until 1975, and president of the Société zoologique de France in 1967.

== Taxa named in his honour ==
Chabaud's name is honoured in many parasite taxa described by his colleagues. The most famous species named in the honour of Chabaud is Plasmodium chabaudi Landau, 1965, a species studied in many laboratories.

Several genera of Nematoda were named in the honour of Chabaud, including Chabaudacuaria Mutafchiev & Kinsella, 2012, Chabaudechina Smales, 1999, Chabaudgolvania Freitas, 1958 (also honouring French parasitologist Jean-Yves Golvan). Chabaudus chabaudi Inglis & Ogden, 1965 has both genus and species names honouring Chabaud.

Many species of Nematoda were named in the honour of Chabaud and include: Africana chabaudi Baker, 1981, Angiostrongylus chabaudi Biocca, 1957, Aonchotheca chabaudi (Justine, 1989) Pisanu & Bain, 1999, Aspiculuris (Paraspiculuris) chabaudi Gupta & Trivedi, 1986, Atractis chabaudi Petter, 1966, Brygoonema chabaudi (Schmidt 1965), Cardiofilaria chabaudi Dissanaike & Fernando, 1965, Cephaluris chabaudi Inglis, 1959, Chromaspirina chabaudi Boucher, 1975, Cooperia chabaudi Diaouré, 1964, Cucullanus chabaudi Le-Van-Hoa & Pham-Ngoc-Khue, 1967, Cyathospirura chabaudi Gupta & Pande, 1981, Cyrnea (Procyrnea) chabaudi Rasheed, 1965, Dioctowittus chabaudi Bain & Ghadirian, 1967, Dujardinascaris chabaudi Diaz-Ungria and Gallardo, 1968, Enterobius chabaudi Kalia & Gupta, 1982, Falcaustra chabaudi Dyer, 1973, Gendrespirura chabaudi Le Van Hoa, 1962, Geopetitia chabaudi Rasheed, 1960, Gyrinicola chabaudi Araujo & de Toledo Artigas, 1983, Habronema chabaudi Ali, 1961, Hassalstrongylus chabaudi Diaw, 1976, Heligmonina chabaudi Desset, 1964, Longistriata chabaudi Desset, 1964, Maxvachonia chabaudi Mawson, 1972, Metacyatholaimus chabaudi Gourbault, 1980, Metathelazia chabaudi Singh & Pande, 1966, Molineus chabaudi Schmidt, 1965, Nematodirus chabaudi Rossi, 1983, Oswaldocruzia chabaudi Ben Slimane & Durette-Desset, 1996, Oswaldofilaria chabaudi Pereira, Souza Lima & Bain, 2010, Oxyspirura (Oxyspirura) chabaudi Baruš, 1965, Paraheligmonina chabaudi Kouyaté, 1981, Pelecitus chabaudi Bartlett & Greiner, 1986, Pelodera chabaudi Crusz & Santiapillai 1982, Protospirura chabaudi Vuylsteke, 1964, Psyllotylenchus chabaudi Deunff & Launay, 1984, Rhabdochona chabaudi Mawson, 1956, Schneidernema chabaudi Quentin, 1966, Sciadiocara chabaudi Schmidt & Kinsella, 1972, Sphaerocephalum chabaudi Inglis, 1962, Spirocamallanus chabaudi Gupta & Garg, 1986, Stewartia chabaudi Rao, 1989, Tachygonetria chabaudi Hering-Hagenbeck, 2001, Vexillata chabaudi Yoyette Vado, 1972, and Vogeloides chabaudi (Singh & Pande 1956).

In addition, species from other phyla include Acanthocephala such as Breizacanthus chabaudi Golvan, 1969 and Centrorhynchus chabaudi Golvan, 1958; Digenea such as Carmyerius chabaudi van Strydonck, 1970, Clinostomum chabaudi Vercammen-Grandjean, 1960, Microphallus chabaudi Capron, Deblock & Biguet, 1958, Neoapocreadium chabaudi Kohn & Fernandes, 1982, Opisthorchis chabaudi Bourgat & Kulo, 1977, Pseudosonsinotrema chabaudi (Caballero & Caballero, 1969) Sullivan, 1974; Cestoda such as Catenotaenia chabaudi Dollfus, 1953, Hemicatenotaenia chabaudi (Dollfus, 1953) and Oochoristica chabaudi Dollfus, 1954; Monogenea such as Diplectanum chabaudi Oliver, 1980 and Ligophorus chabaudi Euzet & Suriano, 1977; Oligochaeta such as Acanthodrilus chabaudi Jamieson & Bennett, 1979; Acari such as Amblyomma chabaudi Rageau, 1965, Brephosceles chabaudi Gaud, 1968 and Orthohalarachne chabaudi Gretillat, 1960; Fleas such as Ctenocephalides chabaudi Beaucournu & Bain, 1982; Phlebotomes such as Phlebotomus (Paraphlebotomus) chabaudi Croset, Abonnenc & Rioux; Parasitic Protozoa such as Hepatozoon chabaudi Brygoo, 1963, the Trypanosome Trypanosoma chabaudi Chandenier, Landau & Baccam, 1988, Nyctotheroides chabaudi Albaret, 1972 and the Gregarine Sphaerorhynchus chabaudi Tuzet & Theodorides, 1951.

A species of snake, Liophidium chabaudi Domergue, 1984, was also named in honour of Chabaud.

== Selected publications ==
- Chavatte, JM.; Chiron, F.; Chabaud, A.; Landau, I. (Mar 2007). "[Probable speciations by host-vector 'fidelity': 14 species of Plasmodium from magpies]". Parasite. 14 (1): 21–37. doi:10.1051/parasite/2007141021. PMID 17432055.
- Landau, I.; Chavatte, JM.; Peters, W.; Chabaud, A. (Mar 2010). "The sub-genera of avian Plasmodium". Parasite. 17 (1): 3–7. doi:10.1051/parasite/2010171003. PMID 20387732.
- Aoutil, N.; Bertani, S.; Bordes, F.; Snounou, G.; Chabaud, A.; Landau, I. (Jun 2005). "Eimeria (Coccidia: Eimeridea) of hares in France: description of new taxa". Parasite. 12 (2): 131–44. doi:10.1051/parasite/2005122131. PMID 15991826.
- Landau, I.; Chavatte, JM.; Karadjian, G.; Chabaud, A.; Beveridge, I. (May 2012). "The haemosporidian parasites of bats with description of Sprattiella alecto gen. nov., sp. nov". Parasite. 19 (2): 137–46. doi:10.1051/parasite/2012192137. PMC 3671437. PMID 22550624.
