= Plasmodium yoelii =

Scientific classification
- Domain: Eukaryota
- Clade: Sar
- Clade: Alveolata
- Phylum: Apicomplexa
- Class: Aconoidasida
- Order: Haemospororida
- Family: Plasmodiidae
- Genus: Plasmodium
- Species: P. yoelii

Binomial name
- Plasmodium yoelii Landau, Michel and Adam, 1968

Subspecies
- Plasmodium yoelii killicki; Plasmodium yoelii nigeriensis; Plasmodium yoelii yoelli

Species of single-celled organism

Plasmodium yoelii is a parasite of the genus Plasmodium subgenus Vinckeia. As in all Plasmodium species, P. yoelii has both vertebrate and insect hosts. The vertebrate hosts for this parasite are mammals.

== Taxonomy ==
This species was described in 1968 by Landau, Michel and Adam. Three subspecies are recognised:

- Plasmodium yoelii killicki
- Plasmodium yoelii nigeriensis
- Plasmodium yoelii yoelli

=== Strains ===
- Plasmodium yoelii 17XNL

== Distribution ==
This species occurs in Africa.

== Vectors ==
The natural vectors of this species are not currently known. One possible is the female Anopheles mosquito which serves as a vector for Plasmodium vivax.

== Hosts ==
This species infects Thamnomys rutilans.

== Pathogenesis ==
Plasmodium yoelii impairs immune responses including impairing responses to other pathogens. Fewer granulocytes move out from the bone marrow and in a separate action induces the rodent's own heme oxygenase 1 (HO-1). Although HO-1 induction is a tolerance response by the host to malaria – preventing damage caused by the host's own immune response – the reduced reactive oxygen species production takes away a weapon vital to fighting some unrelated microbes. Cunnington et al. 2012 find mice tolerating P. yoelii 17XNL do not clear coinfections with other pathogens as easily as they normally would.

== Notes ==
It is used in the laboratory to infect mice, as a model of human malaria, particularly with respect to the immune response. It is advantageous to have a whole-animal model of malaria because often it is difficult to know which factors to study in vitro, particularly in a complex system like the immune system. Moreover, for many experiments it is not ethical or practical to use humans.

One of the special things about this particular model is that it has two strains with vastly different pathogenicity. These are generally referred to as the "lethal" and "non-lethal" strains of the species. Comparison of these two strains can be used to deduce which factors may contribute to more serious malaria infections in humans.
