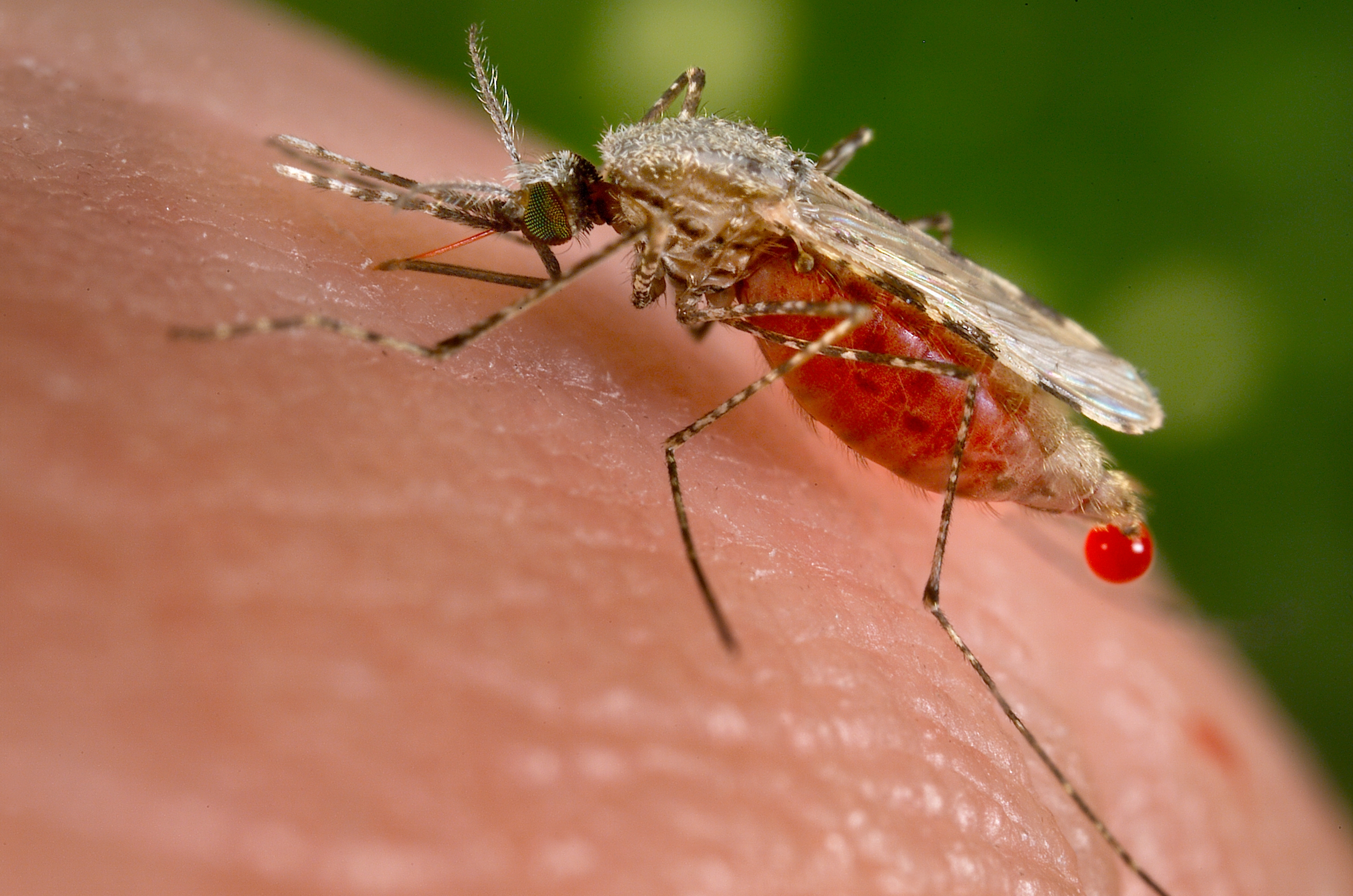

Scientific classification
- Kingdom: Animalia
- Phylum: Arthropoda
- Clade: Pancrustacea
- Class: Insecta
- Order: Diptera
- Family: Culicidae
- Genus: Anopheles
- Subgenus: Cellia
- Species: A. stephensi

Binomial name
- Anopheles stephensi Liston, 1901

= Anopheles stephensi =

Species of mosquito

Anopheles stephensi is a primary mosquito vector of malaria in urban India and is included in the same subgenus as Anopheles gambiae, the primary malaria vector in Africa. A. gambiae consists of a complex of morphologically identical species of mosquitoes, along with all other major malaria vectors; however, A. stephensi has not yet been included in any of these complexes. Nevertheless, two races of A. stephensi exist based on differences in egg dimensions and the number of ridges on the eggs; A. s. stephensi sensu stricto, the type form, is a competent malaria vector that is found in urban areas, and A. s. mysorensis, the variety form, exists in rural areas and exhibits considerable zoophilic behaviour, making it a poor malaria vector. However, A. s. mysorensis is a detrimental vector in Iran. An intermediate form also exists in rural communities and peri-urban areas, though its vector status is unknown. About 12% of malaria cases in India are due to A. stephensi.

In November 2015, an American research group demonstrated that an A. stephensi with genetic modifications could be rendered incapable of transmitting malaria, and that 99.5% of the mutant mosquitoes' offspring were also immune.

In April 2023, a malaria outbreak at Dire Dawa University in Ethiopia affected 1,300 students. The outbreak was a mystery because it occurred in the dry season and in an urban area, both atypical conditions for common cases of malaria in this area of the world. Blood tests confirming malaria's ring-shaped parasite ultimately led researchers to conclude that it was the work of A. stephensi, which thrives in urban areas and dry seasons, and has a resistance to insecticides.

A team of scientists, headed by an entomologist from the University of Oxford, conducted an evaluation of Africa's environments to determine if they provide suitable conditions for the A. stephensi mosquito. Their findings indicate that the ongoing spread of this species could potentially expose an additional 126 million persons to the risk of malaria.

== Habitat ==
In rural areas, the larvae of A. stephensi may exist in many aquatic habitats, such as ponds, streams, swamps, marshes, and other sources of standing water. They may also occupy smaller environments, such as tree holes, leaf axils, and man-made containers. The larvae of A. s. mysorensis exclusively prefer to occupy stone pots and earthenware containers. This species is also able to endure high levels of salinity, and have been found to breed readily in water where the salinity is equal to or even surpassing that of sea water. Furthermore, A. stephensi breeds in a number of different water-bodies in urban areas, but predominantly in artificial containers, walls, overhead tanks, and ground level water tanks.

Most larvae feed on microorganisms and particle matter suspended in water. However, later in development, adult males feed on the nectar of flowers, whereas females take blood meals, which help produce viable eggs.

== Hosts ==
Hosts include Bos taurus, Mus musculus and Pimephales promelas.

== Parasites ==
Anopheles stephensi is a vector of bovine leukemia virus and Plasmodium berghei. Mack and Vandenberg performed a series of experiments 1978-1979 finding that P. berghei derives nutrients from A. stephensi hemolymph during the sporogonic phase. A. stephensi is an important vector for the human malaria species Plasmodium falciparum.

== Biochemistry ==
Mack and Vandenberg characterized A. stephensi's hemolymph composition in the late 1970s.

== Distribution ==
Anopheles stephensi is a subtropical species that predominates in the Indian subcontinent (except Nepal and Sri Lanka) and is also distributed across the Middle East and South Asia region, existing in countries such as: Afghanistan, Bahrain, Bangladesh, China, Egypt, India, Iran, Iraq, Oman, Pakistan, Saudi Arabia, and Thailand. A. stephensi was discovered to be established on the continent of Africa, in Djibouti on the Horn of Africa in 2012 or 2013, in 2016 in Ethiopia, Sri Lanka in 2017, in 2019 in the Republic of the Sudan/North Sudan. and in 2022 in Kenya.

== Seasonal activity ==
Anopheles stephensi is considered to be endophilic and endophagic, regardless that it may feed outdoors during the summer, when weather is warmer and humans and animals are more likely to sleep outside in the open air. Although indoor feeding habits have shown no variation between seasons, adult females tend to feed more often at night during the summer rather than during the day in winter. A. stephensi shows a greater preference for humans over animals in urban areas, where they can be found year-round.

== Insecticide resistance ==
The introduced African population appears to have arrived with several insecticide resistances.

== Climate change and temperature ==
Ideal temperature for this mosquito is between 27 and 30 °C. . Climate change is likely to expand this mosquito’s possible range around the world.
