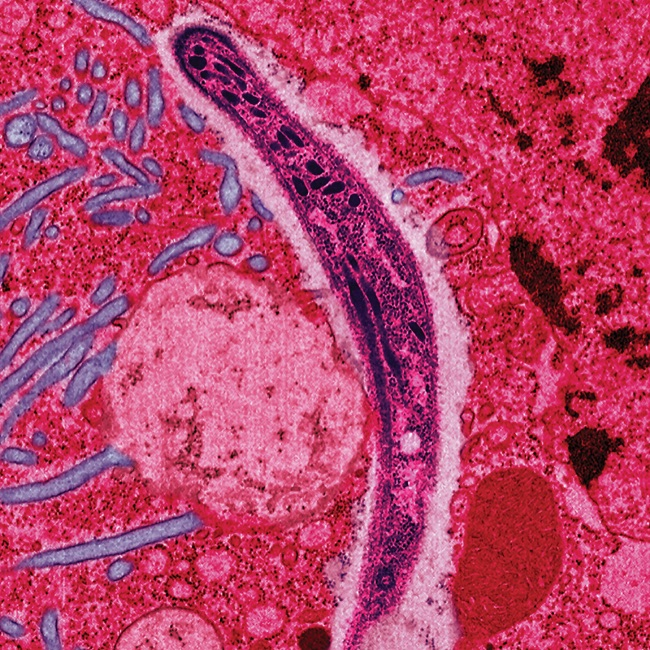
- False-colored electron micrograph of a sporozoite

Scientific classification
- Domain: Eukaryota
- Supergroup: Alveolata
- Phylum: Apicomplexa
- Class: Aconoidasida
- Order: Haemospororida
- Family: Plasmodiidae
- Genus: Plasmodium; Marchiafava & Celli, 1885

= Plasmodium =

Genus of parasitic protists that can cause malaria

Plasmodium is a genus of unicellular eukaryotes that are obligate parasites of vertebrates and insects such as mosquitoes in the genus Anopheles. The life cycles of Plasmodium species involve development in a blood-feeding insect host which then injects parasites into a vertebrate host during a blood meal. Parasites grow within a vertebrate body tissue (often the liver) before entering the bloodstream to infect red blood cells. The ensuing destruction of host red blood cells can result in malaria. During this infection, some parasites are picked up by a blood-feeding insect (mosquitoes in majority cases), continuing the life cycle.

Plasmodium is a member of the phylum Apicomplexa, a large group of parasitic eukaryotes. Within Apicomplexa, Plasmodium is in the order Haemosporida and family Plasmodiidae. Over 200 species of Plasmodium have been described, many of which have been subdivided into 14 subgenera based on parasite morphology and host range. Evolutionary relationships among different Plasmodium species do not always follow taxonomic boundaries; some species that are morphologically similar or infect the same host turn out to be distantly related.

Species of Plasmodium are distributed globally wherever suitable hosts are found. Insect hosts are most frequently mosquitoes of the genera Culex and Anopheles. Vertebrate hosts include reptiles, birds, and mammals. Plasmodium parasites were first identified in the late 19th century by Charles Laveran. Over the course of the 20th century, many other species were discovered in various hosts and classified, including five species that regularly infect humans: P. vivax, P. falciparum, P. malariae, P. ovale, and P. knowlesi. P. falciparum is by far the most lethal in humans, resulting in hundreds of thousands of deaths per year. A number of drugs have been developed to treat Plasmodium infection; however, the parasites have evolved resistance to each drug developed.

Although the parasite can also infect people via blood transfusion, this is very rare, and Plasmodium cannot be spread from person to person. Some subspecies of Plasmodium are obligate intracellular parasites.

== Description ==
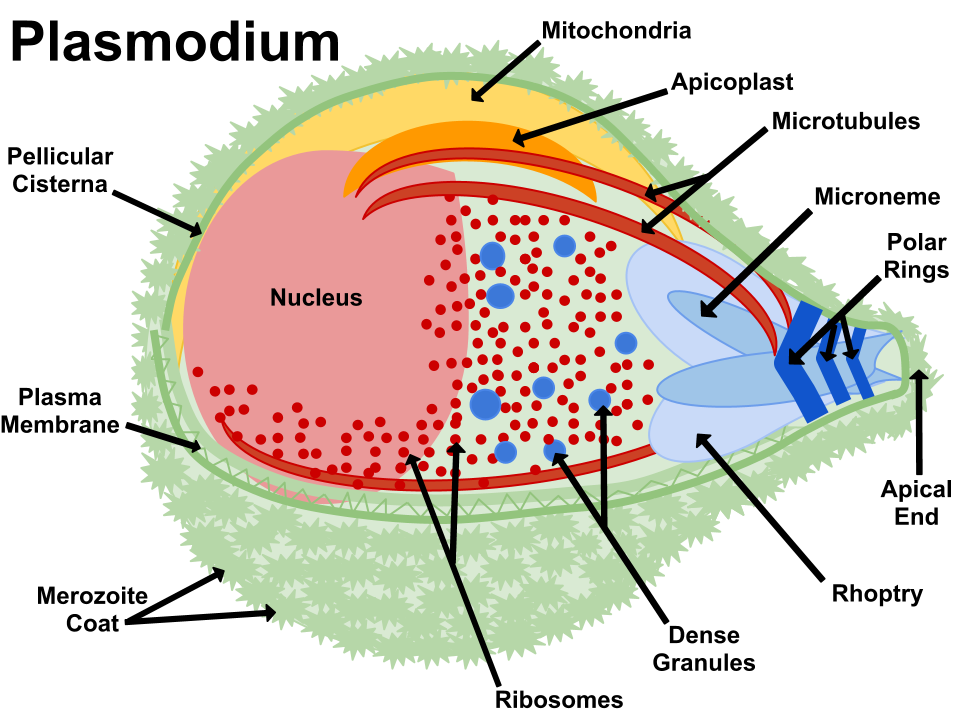
Plasmodium is a eukaryote but with unusual features.

The genus Plasmodium consists of all eukaryotes in the phylum Apicomplexa that both undergo the asexual replication process of merogony inside host red blood cells and produce the crystalline pigment hemozoin as a byproduct of digesting host hemoglobin. Plasmodium species contain many features that are common to other eukaryotes, and some that are unique to their phylum or genus. The Plasmodium genome is separated into 14 chromosomes contained in the nucleus. Plasmodium parasites maintain a single copy of their genome through much of the life cycle, doubling the genome only for a brief sexual exchange within the midgut of the insect host. Attached to the nucleus is the endoplasmic reticulum (ER), which functions similarly to the ER in other eukaryotes. Proteins are trafficked from the ER to the Golgi apparatus which generally consists of a single membrane-bound compartment in Apicomplexans. From here, proteins are trafficked to various cellular compartments or to the cell surface.

Like other apicomplexans, Plasmodium species have several cellular structures at the apical end of the parasite that serve as specialized organelles for secreting effectors into the host. The most prominent are the bulbous rhoptries which contain parasite proteins involved in invading the host cell and modifying the host once inside. Adjacent to the rhoptries are smaller structures termed micronemes that contain parasite proteins required for motility as well as recognizing and attaching to host cells. Spread throughout the parasite are secretory vesicles called dense granules that contain parasite proteins involved in modifying the membrane that separates the parasite from the host, termed the parasitophorous vacuole.

Species of Plasmodium also contain two large membrane-bound organelles of endosymbiotic origin, the mitochondrion and the apicoplast, both of which play key roles in the parasite's metabolism. Unlike mammalian cells which contain many mitochondria, Plasmodium cells contain a single large mitochondrion that coordinates its division with that of the Plasmodium cell. Like in other eukaryotes, the Plasmodium mitochondrion is capable of generating energy in the form of ATP via the citric acid cycle; however, this function is only required for parasite survival in the insect host, and is not needed for growth in red blood cells. A second organelle, the apicoplast, is derived from a secondary endosymbiosis event, in this case the acquisition of a red alga by the Plasmodium ancestor. The apicoplast is involved in the synthesis of various metabolic precursors, including fatty acids, isoprenoids, iron-sulphur clusters, and components of the heme biosynthesis pathway.

== Life cycle ==
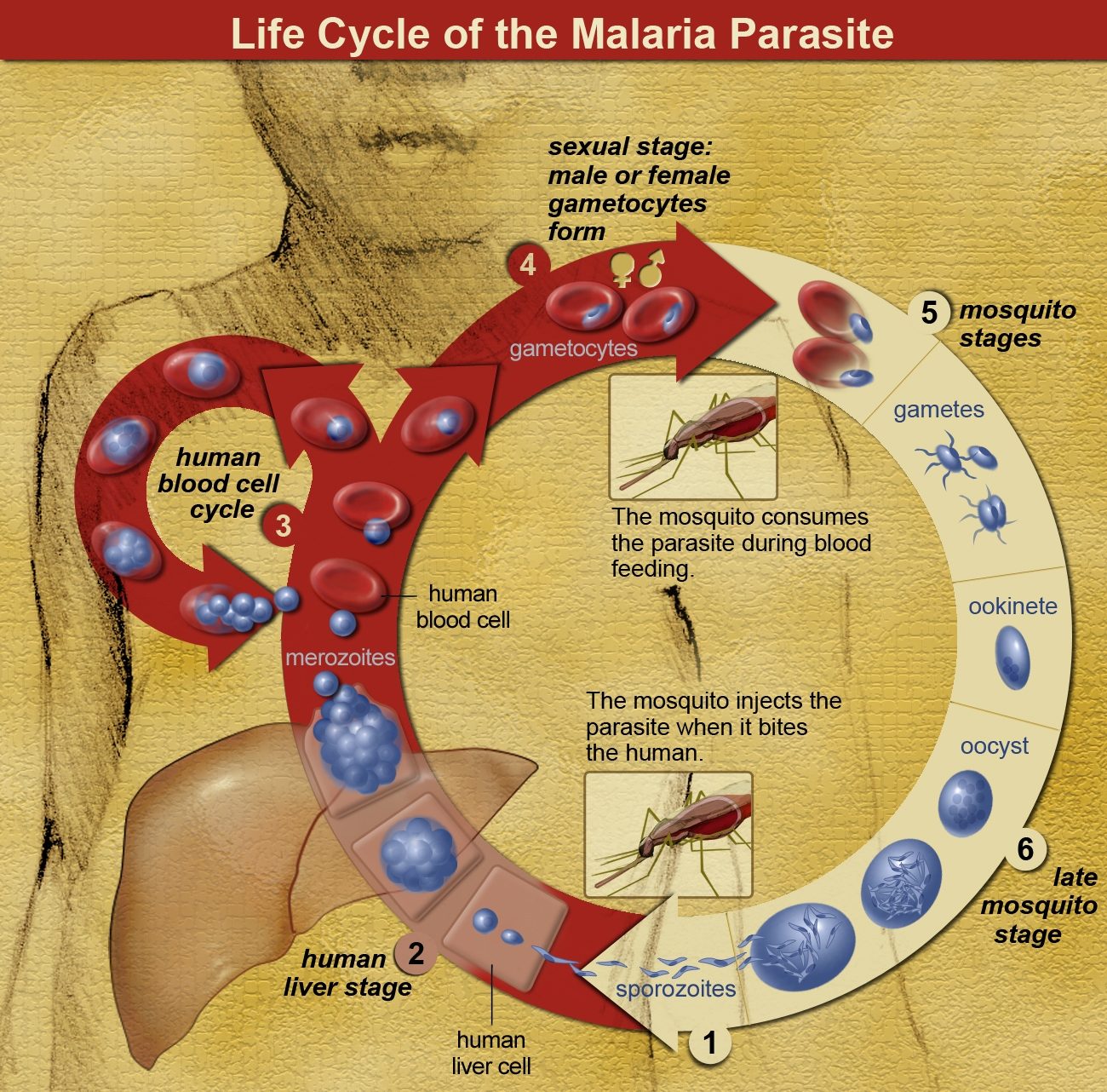
Life cycle of a species that infects humans

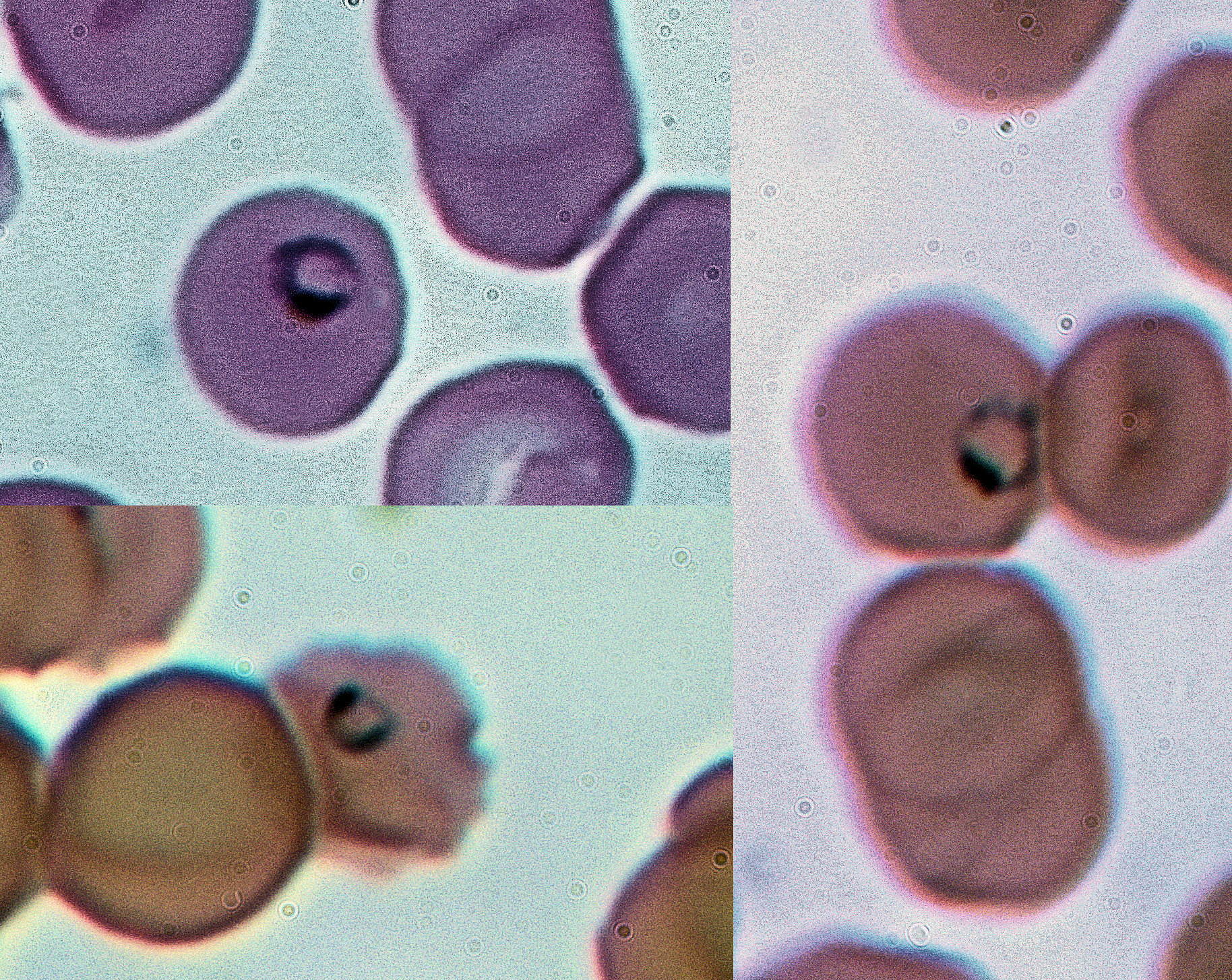
Ring forms of Plasmodium inside human red blood cells (Giemsa stain)

The life cycle of Plasmodium involves several distinct stages in the insect and vertebrate hosts. Parasites are generally introduced into a vertebrate host by the bite of an insect host (generally a mosquito, with the exception of some Plasmodium species of reptiles). Parasites first infect the liver or other tissue, where they undergo a single large round of replication before exiting the host cell to infect erythrocytes. At this point, some species of Plasmodium of primates can form a long-lived dormant stage called a hypnozoite, which can remain in the liver for more than a year. However, for most Plasmodium species, the parasites in infected liver cells are only what are called merozoites. After emerging from the liver, they enter red blood cells, as explained above. They then go through continuous cycles of erythrocyte infection, while a small percentage of parasites differentiate into a sexual stage called a gametocyte which is picked up by an insect host taking a blood meal. In some hosts, invasion of erythrocytes by Plasmodium species can result in disease, called malaria. This can sometimes be severe, rapidly followed by death of the host (e.g. P. falciparum in humans). In other hosts, Plasmodium infection can apparently be asymptomatic.

Even when humans have such subclinical plasmodial infections, there can nevertheless be very large numbers of multiplying parasites concealed in, particularly, the spleen and bone marrow. Certainly, this applies in the case of P. vivax. These hidden parasites (in addition to hypnozoites) are thought to be the origin of instances of recurrent P. vivax malaria.

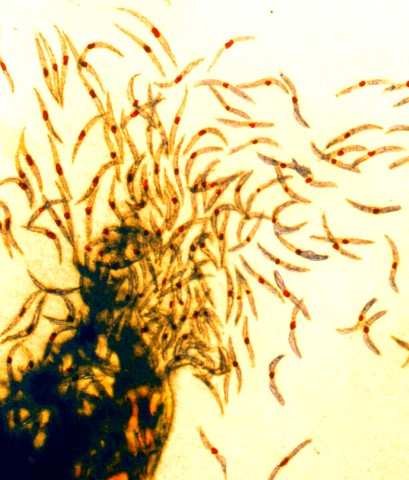
Sporozoites, one of several different forms of the parasite, from a mosquito

Within the red blood cells, the merozoites grow first to a ring-shaped form and then to a larger form called a trophozoite. Trophozoites then mature to schizonts which divide several times to produce new merozoites. The infected red blood cell eventually bursts, allowing the new merozoites to travel within the bloodstream to infect new red blood cells. Most merozoites continue this replicative cycle, however some merozoites upon infecting red blood cells differentiate into male or female sexual forms called gametocytes. These gametocytes circulate in the blood until they are taken up when a mosquito feeds on the infected vertebrate host, taking up blood which includes the gametocytes.

In the mosquito, the gametocytes move along with the blood meal to the mosquito's midgut. Here the gametocytes develop into male and female gametes which fertilize each other, forming a zygote. Zygotes then develop into a motile form called an ookinete, which penetrates the wall of the midgut. Upon traversing the midgut wall, the ookinete embeds into the gut's exterior membrane and develops into an oocyst. Oocysts divide many times to produce large numbers of small elongated sporozoites. These sporozoites migrate to the salivary glands of the mosquito where they can be injected into the blood of the next host the mosquito bites, repeating the cycle.

== Evolution and taxonomy ==
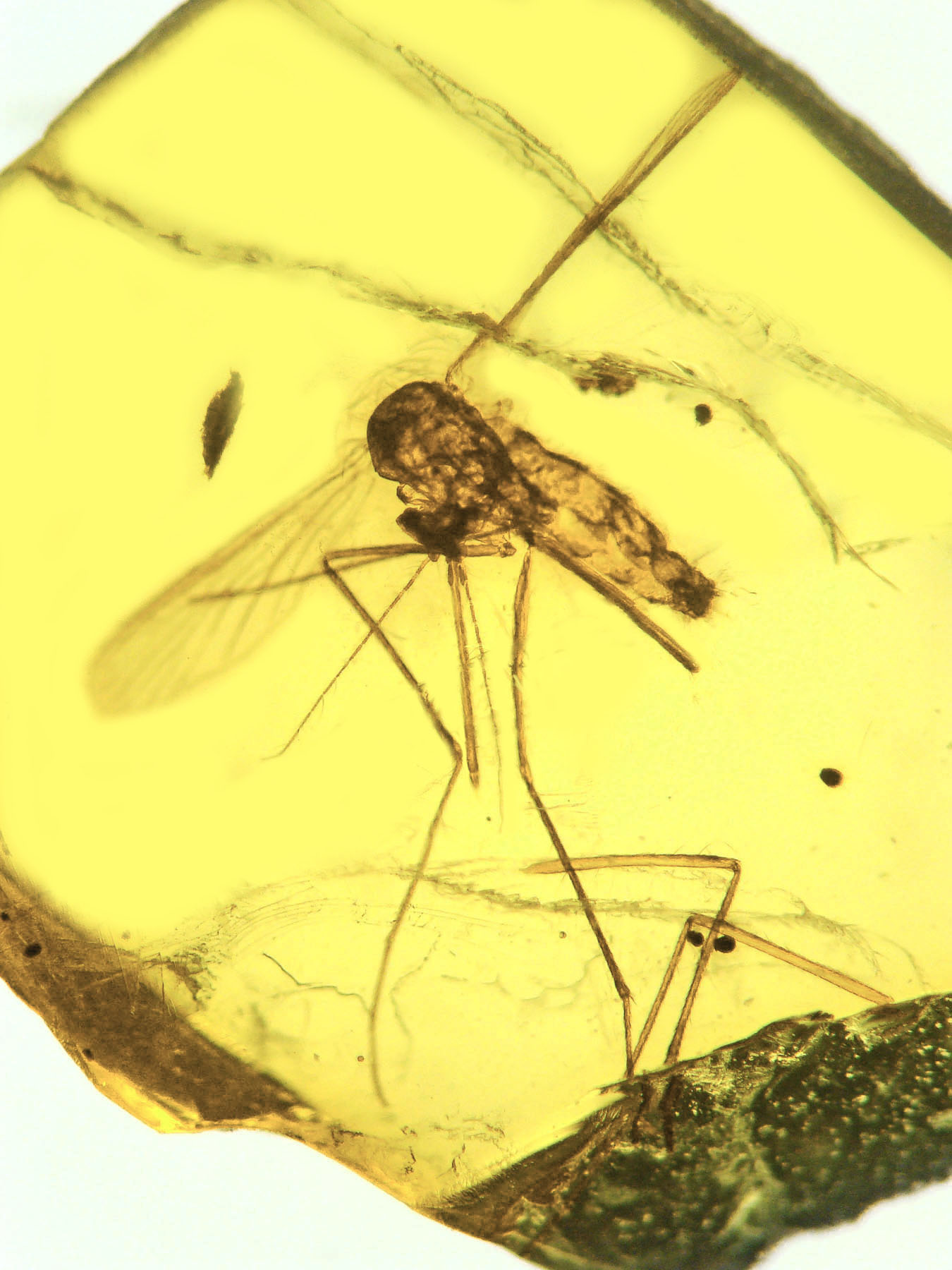
Oldest mosquito fossil with Plasmodium dominicana, 15–20 million years old

=== Taxonomy ===
Plasmodium belongs to the phylum Apicomplexa, a taxonomic group of single-celled parasites with characteristic secretory organelles at one end of the cell. Within Apicomplexa, Plasmodium is within the order Haemosporida, a group that includes all apicomplexans that live within blood cells. Based on the presence of the pigment hemozoin and the method of asexual reproduction, the order is further split into four families, of which Plasmodium is in the family Plasmodiidae.

The genus Plasmodium consists of over 200 species, generally described on the basis of their appearance in blood smears of infected vertebrates. These species have been categorized on the basis of their morphology and host range into 14 subgenera:

- Subgenus Asiamoeba (Telford, 1988) – reptiles
- Subgenus Bennettinia (Valkiunas, 1997) – birds
- Subgenus Carinamoeba (Garnham, 1966) – reptiles
- Subgenus Giovannolaia (Corradetti, et al. 1963) – birds
- Subgenus Haemamoeba (Corradetti, et al. 1963) – birds
- Subgenus Huffia (Corradetti, et al. 1963) – birds
- Subgenus Lacertamoeba (Telford, 1988) – reptiles
- Subgenus Laverania (Bray, 1958) – great apes, humans
- Subgenus Novyella (Corradetti, et al. 1963) – birds
- Subgenus Ophidiella (Telford, 1988) – reptiles
- Subgenus Paraplasmodium (Telford, 1988) – reptiles
- Subgenus Plasmodium (Bray, 1955) – monkeys and apes
- Subgenus Sauramoeba (Garnham, 1966) – reptiles
- Subgenus Vinckeia (Garnham, 1964) – mammals inc. primates

Species infecting monkeys and apes with the exceptions of P. falciparum and P. reichenowi (which together make up the subgenus Laverania) are classified in the subgenus Plasmodium. Parasites infecting other mammals including some primates (lemurs and others) are classified in the subgenus Vinckeia. The five subgenera Bennettinia, Giovannolaia, Haemamoeba, Huffia, and Novyella contain the known avian malarial species. The remaining subgenera: Asiamoeba, Carinamoeba, Lacertamoeba, Ophidiella, Paraplasmodium, and Sauramoeba contain the diverse groups of parasites found to infect reptiles.

=== Phylogeny ===
More recent studies of Plasmodium species using molecular methods have implied that the group's evolution has not perfectly followed taxonomy. Many Plasmodium species that are morphologically similar or infect the same hosts turn out to be only distantly related. In the 1990s, several studies sought to evaluate evolutionary relationships of Plasmodium species by comparing ribosomal RNA and a surface protein gene from various species, finding the human parasite P. falciparum to be more closely related to avian parasites than to other parasites of primates. However, later studies sampling more Plasmodium species found the parasites of mammals to form a clade along with the genus Hepatocystis, while the parasites of birds or lizards appear to form a separate clade with evolutionary relationships not following the subgenera:

- Leucocytozoon
- - Haemoproteus
  - Plasmodium
    - Plasmodium of lizards and birds
    - - Subgenus Laverania
      - - Subgenus Plasmodium
        - Subgenus Vinckeia
        - Hepatocystis (parasites of bats)

Estimates for when different Plasmodium lineages diverged have differed broadly. Estimates for the diversification of the order Haemosporida range from around 16.2 million to 100 million years ago. There has been particular interest in dating the divergence of the human parasite P. falciparum from other Plasmodium lineages due to its medical importance. For this, estimated dates range from 110,000 to 2.5 million years ago.

== Distribution ==
Plasmodium species are distributed globally. All Plasmodium species are parasitic and must pass between a vertebrate host and an insect host to complete their life cycles. Different species of Plasmodium display different host ranges, with some species restricted to a single vertebrate and insect host, while other species can infect several species of vertebrates and/or insects.

=== Vertebrates ===
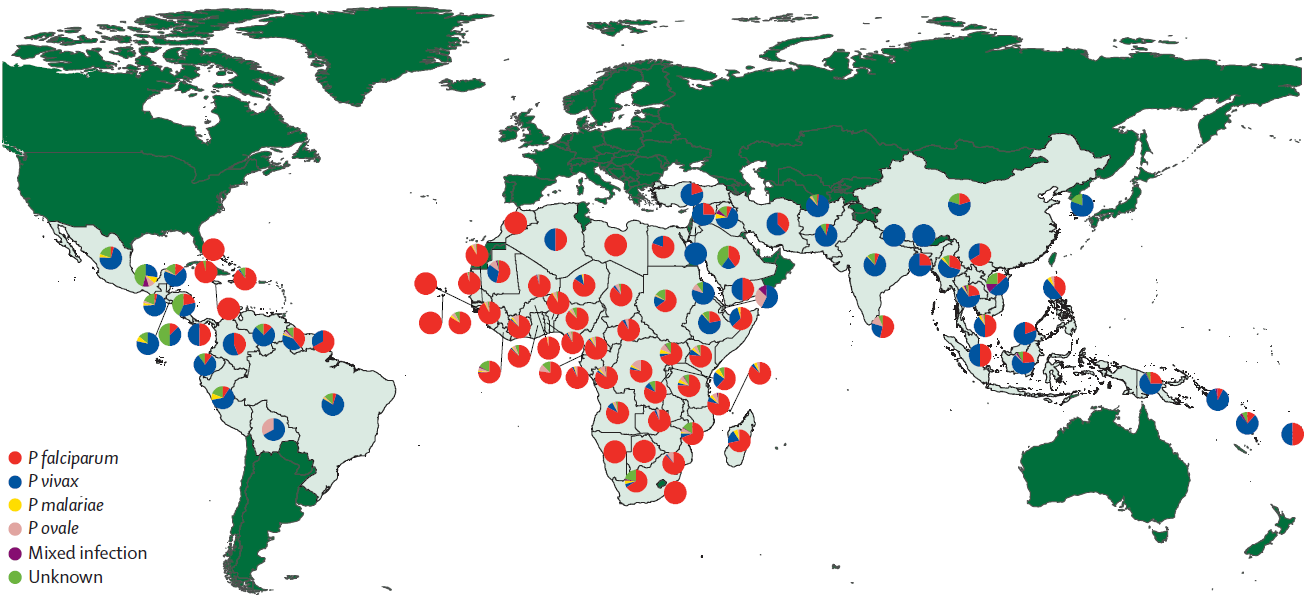
Relative incidence of Plasmodium species by country of origin for imported cases to non-endemic countries

Plasmodium parasites have been described in a broad array of vertebrate hosts including reptiles, birds, and mammals. While many species can infect more than one vertebrate host, they are generally specific to one of these classes (such as birds).

Humans are primarily infected by five species of Plasmodium, with the overwhelming majority of severe disease and death caused by Plasmodium falciparum. Some species that infect humans can also infect other primates, and zoonoses of certain species (e.g. P. knowlesi) from other primates to humans are common. Non-human primates also contain a variety of Plasmodium species that do not generally infect humans. Some of these can cause severe disease in primates, while others can remain in the host for prolonged periods without causing disease. Many other mammals also carry Plasmodium species, such as a variety of rodents, ungulates, and bats. Again, some species of Plasmodium can cause severe disease in some of these hosts, while many appear not to.

Over 150 species of Plasmodium infect a broad variety of birds. In general each species of Plasmodium infects one to a few species of birds. Plasmodium parasites that infect birds tend to persist in a given host for years or for the life time of the host, although in some cases Plasmodium infections can result in severe illness and rapid death. Unlike with Plasmodium species infecting mammals, those infecting birds are distributed across the globe.

Species from several subgenera of Plasmodium infect diverse reptiles. Plasmodium parasites have been described in most lizard families and, like avian parasites, are spread worldwide. Again, parasites can result either in severe disease or be apparently asymptomatic depending on the parasite and the host.

A number of drugs have been developed over the years to control Plasmodium infection in vertebrate hosts, particularly in humans. Quinine was used as a frontline antimalarial from the 17th century until widespread resistance emerged in the early 20th century. Resistance to quinine spurred the development of a broad array of antimalarial medications through the 20th century including chloroquine, proguanil, atovaquone, sulfadoxine/pyrimethamine, mefloquine, and artemisinin. In all cases, parasites resistant to a given drug have emerged within a few decades of the drugs deployment. To combat this, antimalarial drugs are frequently used in combination, with artemisinin combination therapies currently the gold standard for treatment. In general, antimalarial drugs target the life stages of Plasmodium parasites that reside within vertebrate red blood cells, as these are the stages that tend to cause disease. However, drugs targeting other stages of the parasite life cycle are under development in order to prevent infection in travelers and to prevent transmission of sexual stages to insect hosts.

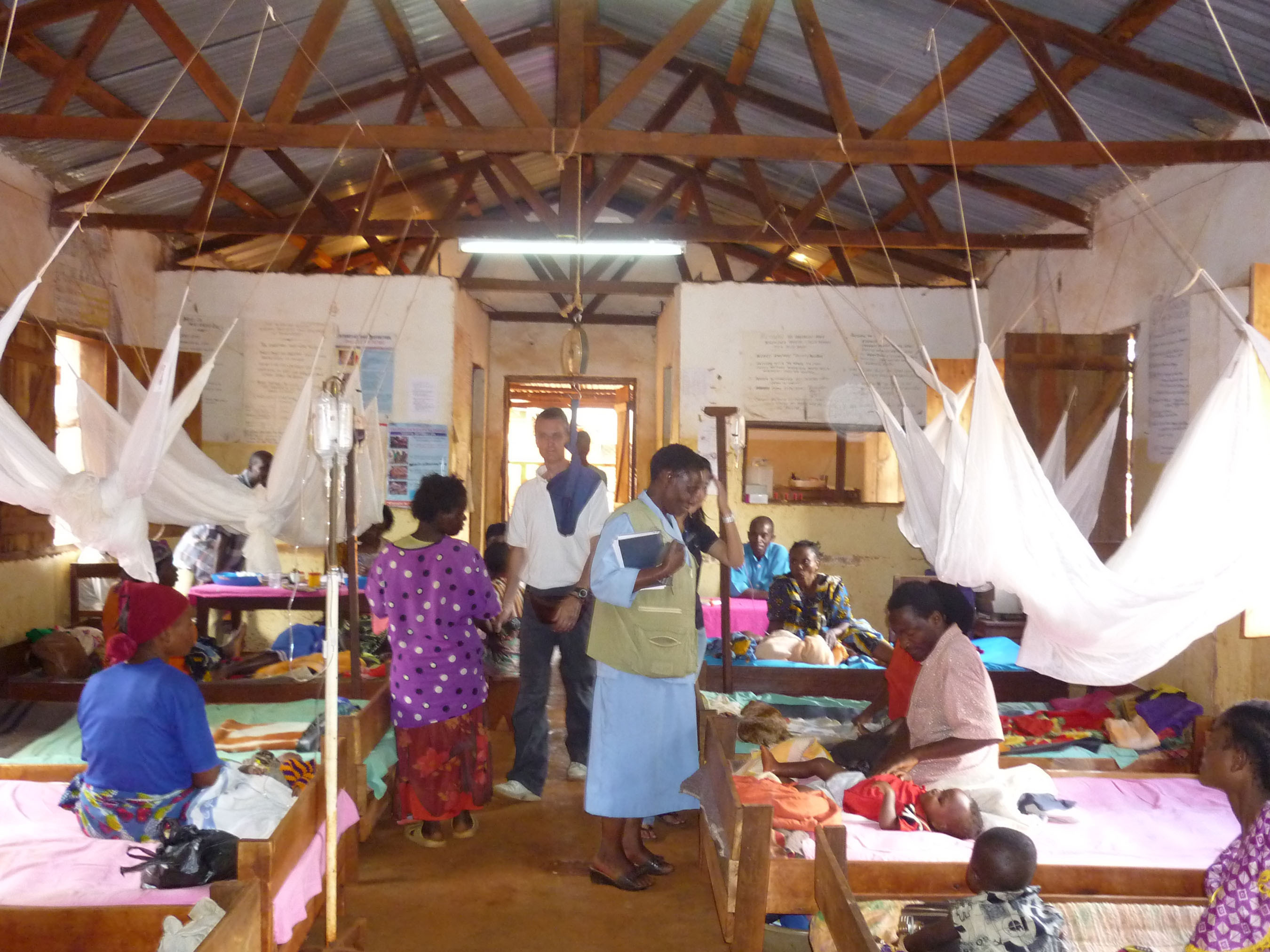
A clinic for treating human malaria in Tanzania

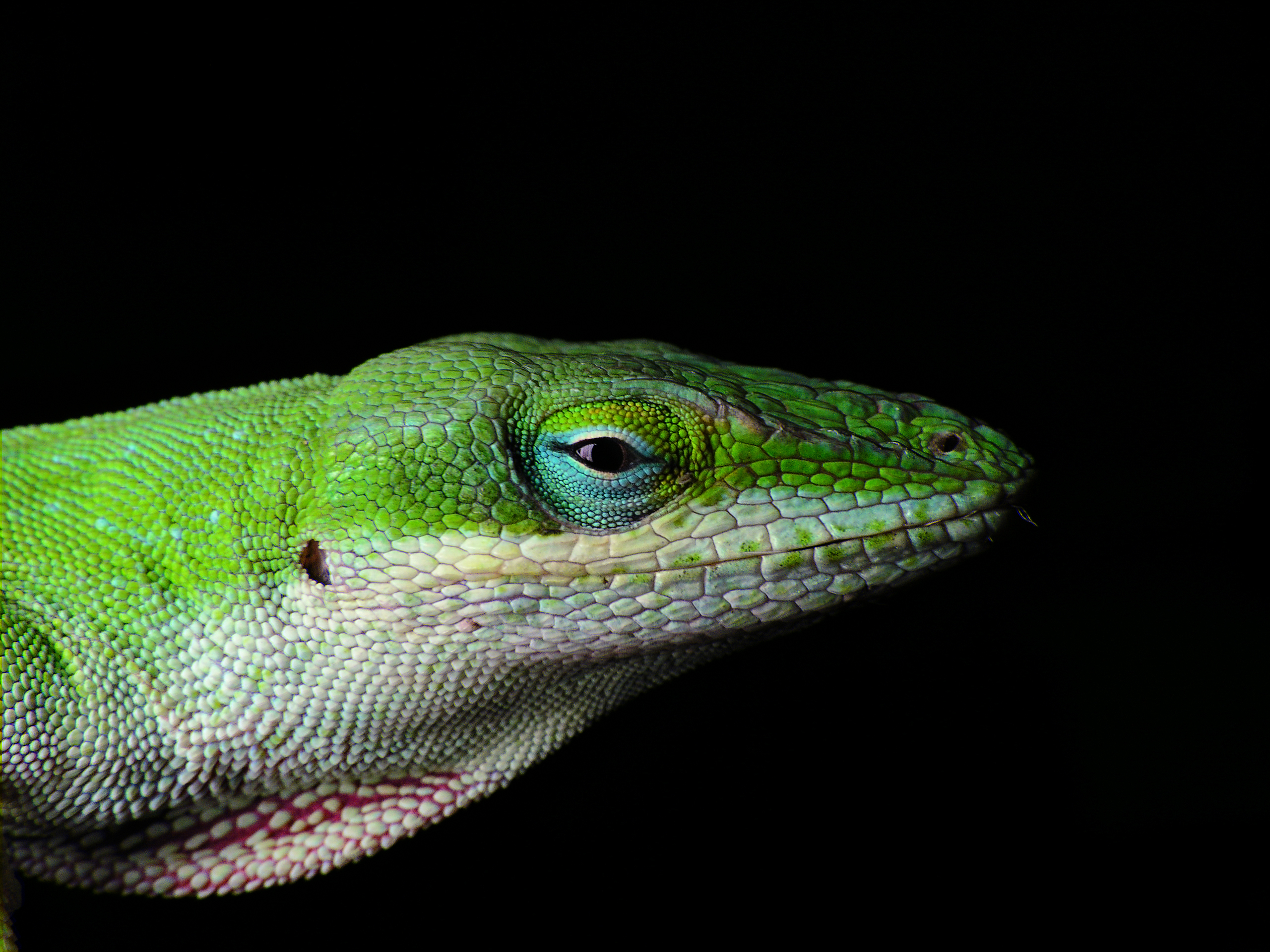
Over 3000 species of lizard, including the Carolina anole (Anolis carolinensis), carry some 90 kinds of malaria.

=== Insects ===
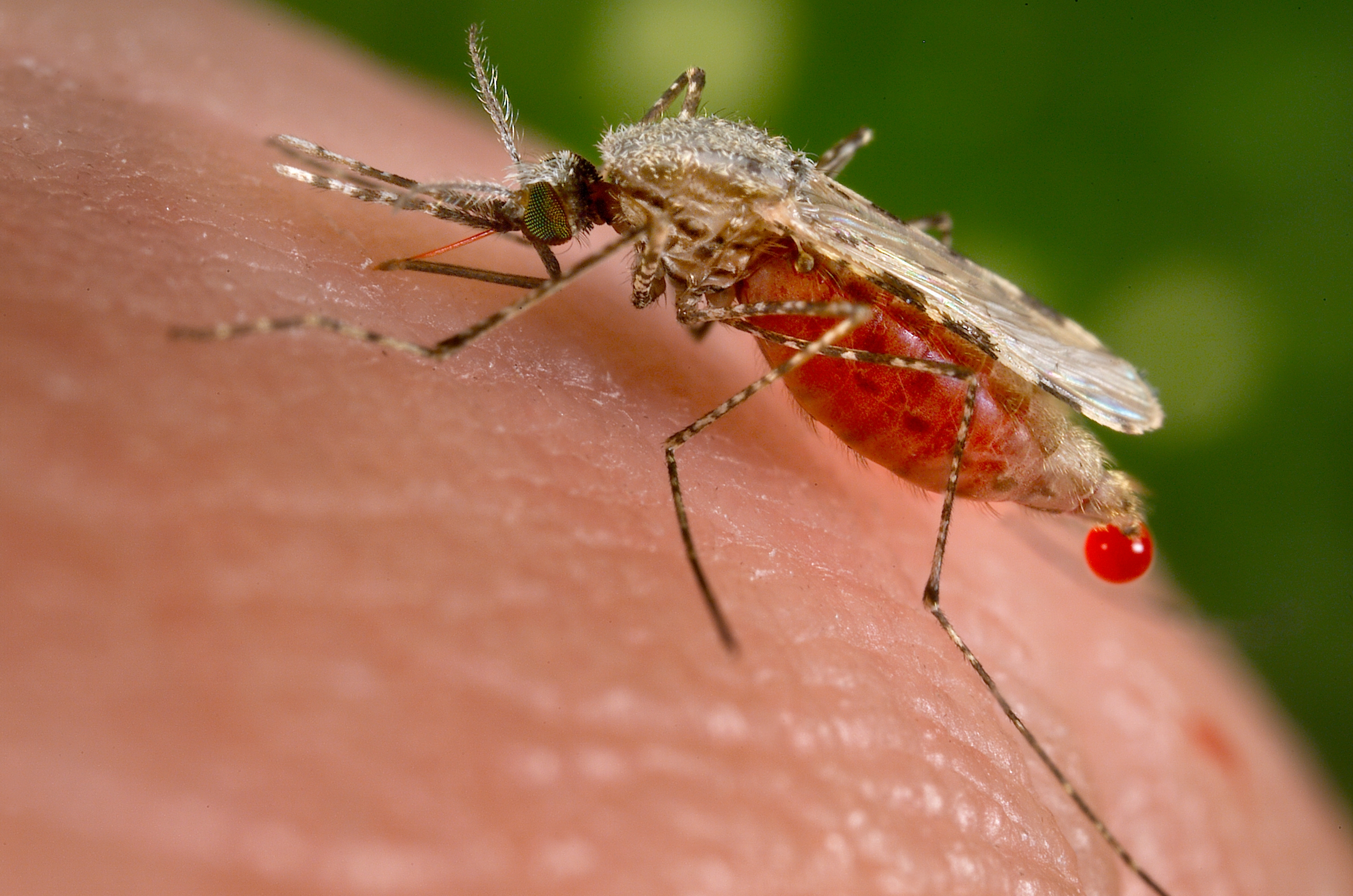
The mosquito Anopheles stephensi is among the blood-feeding insects that can be infected by a species of Plasmodium.

In addition to a vertebrate host, all Plasmodium species also infect a bloodsucking insect host, generally a mosquito (although some reptile-infecting parasites are transmitted by sandflies). Mosquitoes of the genera Culex, Anopheles, Culiseta, Mansonia and Aedes act as insect hosts for various Plasmodium species. The best studied of these are the Anopheles mosquitoes which host the Plasmodium parasites of human malaria, as well as Culex mosquitoes which host the Plasmodium species that cause malaria in birds. Only female mosquitoes are infected with Plasmodium, since only they feed on the blood of vertebrate hosts. Different species affect their insect hosts differently. Sometimes, insects infected with Plasmodium have reduced lifespan and reduced ability to produce offspring. Further, some species of Plasmodium appear to cause insects to prefer to bite infected vertebrate hosts over non-infected hosts.

== History ==
Charles Louis Alphonse Laveran first described parasites in the blood of malaria patients in 1880. He named the parasite Oscillaria malariae. In 1885, zoologists Ettore Marchiafava and Angelo Celli reexamined the parasite and termed it a member of a new genus, Plasmodium, named for the resemblance to the multinucleate cells of slime molds of the same name. (Note: The plural of Plasmodium is not Plasmodia. Instead multiple species of the genus are referred to as "Plasmodium species".) The fact that several species may be involved in causing different forms of malaria was first recognized by Camillo Golgi in 1886. In 1897, William Welch identified and named Plasmodium falciparum. Soon thereafter, Giovanni Batista Grassi and Raimondo Filetti named the parasites causing two different types of human malaria Plasmodium vivax and Plasmodium malariae.This was followed by the recognition of the other two species of Plasmodium which infect humans: Plasmodium ovale (1922) and Plasmodium knowlesi (identified in long-tailed macaques in 1931; in humans in 1965). The contribution of insect hosts to the Plasmodium life cycle was described in 1897 by Ronald Ross and in 1899 by Giovanni Batista Grassi, Amico Bignami and Giuseppe Bastianelli.

In 1966, Cyril Garnham proposed separating Plasmodium into nine subgenera based on host specificity and parasite morphology. This included four subgenera that had previously been proposed for bird-infecting Plasmodium species by A. Corradetti in 1963. This scheme was expanded upon by Sam R. Telford in 1988 when he reclassified Plasmodium parasites that infect reptiles, adding five subgenera. In 1997, G. Valkiunas reclassified the bird-infecting Plasmodium species adding a fifth subgenus: Bennettinia.

== See also ==
- Haematozoa
- List of Plasmodium species
- Plasmodium molecular tools
- Plasmodium RUF6 RNA
