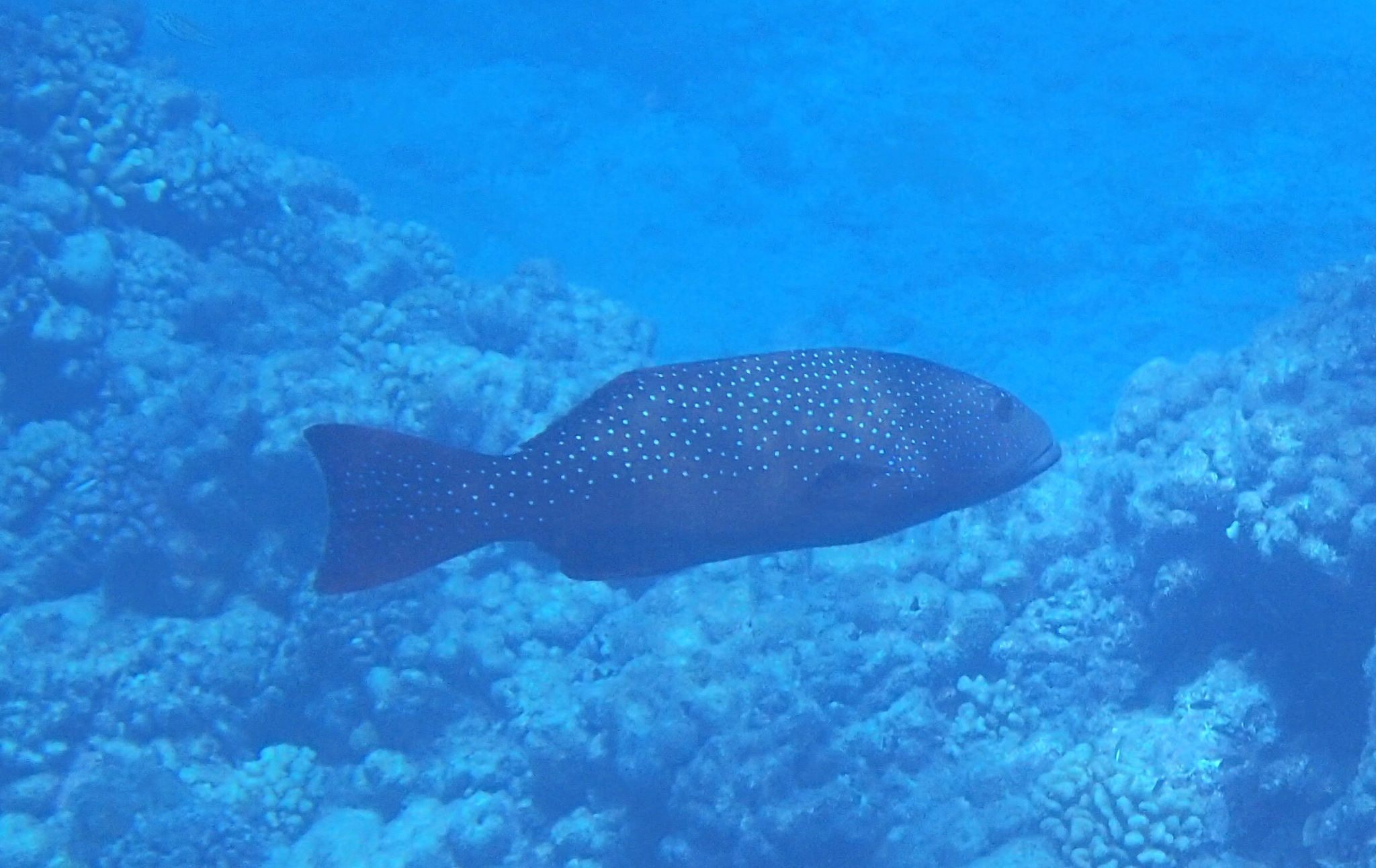
- Adult
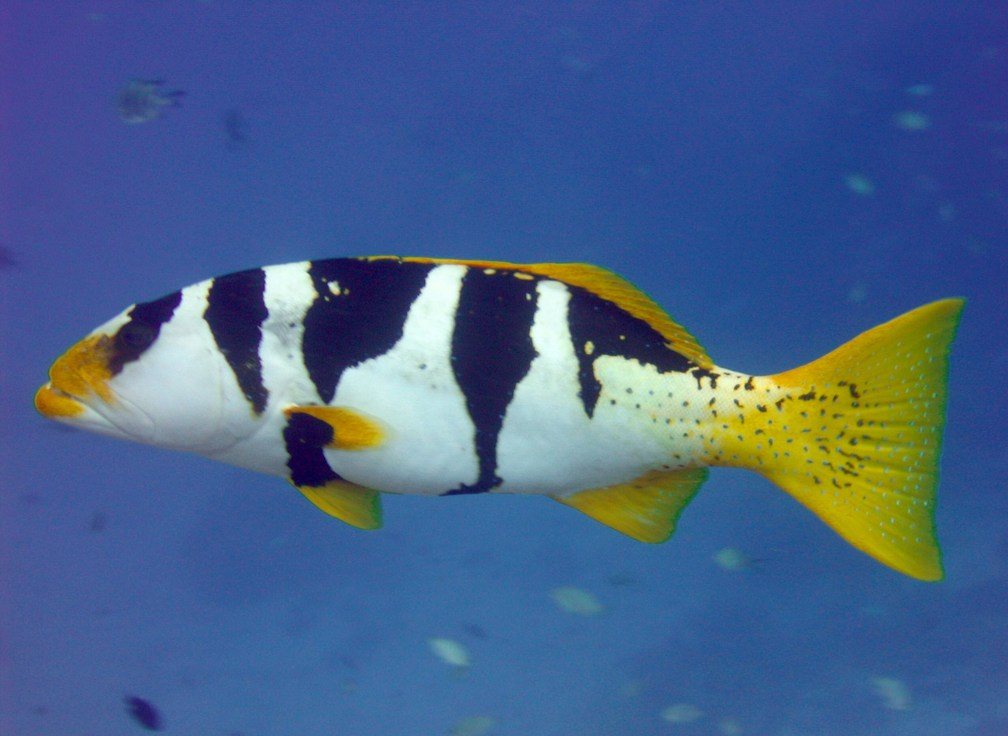
- Juvenile

Conservation status
- Least Concern (IUCN 3.1)

Scientific classification
- Kingdom: Animalia
- Phylum: Chordata
- Class: Actinopterygii
- Division: Teleostei
- Order: Perciformes
- Family: Epinephelidae
- Genus: Plectropomus
- Species: P. laevis

Binomial name
- Plectropomus laevis (Lacépède, 1801)

Synonyms{
- List: Labrus laevis Lacépède, 1801; Bodianus melanoleucus Lacépède, 1802; Paracanthistius melanoleucus (Lacépède, 1802); Plectropoma melanoleucum (Lacépède, 1802); Plectropomus maculatum melanoleucum (Lacépède, 1802); Plectropomus melanoleucus (Lacépède, 1802); Bodianus cyclostomus (Lacépède, 1802)

= Plectropomus laevis =

Species of fish

Plectropomus laevis, known commonly as the black-saddled coral grouper, cluespotted coral trout, blacksaddled coral trout, blue-spot trout, Chinese footballer, footballer cod, footballer coral trout, oceanic coral trout or tiger trout, is a species of marine ray-finned fish, a grouper from the subfamily Epinephelinae which is part of the family Serranidae, which also includes the anthias and sea basses. It is found in the Indo-Pacific region.

== Taxonomy ==
Plectropomus laevis was first formally described as Labrus laevis in 1801 by the French zoologist Bernard Germain de Lacépède with the type locality given as Grand golfe de l'lnde, the Indian Ocean.

== Distribution ==
Plectropomus laevis has a wide Indo-Pacific distribution. In eastern Africa it occurs from Kenya to Mozambique through islands of the tropical Indian Ocean, but not the Asian coast, and east into the Pacific Ocean as far east as French Polynesia and Pitcairn Island, north as far as southern Japan and south as far as Australia. In Australia it is found at Rowley Shoals and Scott Reef in Western Australia, Ashmore Reef in the Timor Sea and on the Great Barrier Reef as far south as One Tree Island and other reefs in the Coral Sea of Queensland, as well as in the region of Lord Howe Island in the Tasman Sea/

== Description ==
Plectropomus laevis has a body which is elongate and robust, with the standard length being 2.9 to 3.9 times the depth of the body. The preopercle is mostly rounded, with three large, downward pointing spines along the bottome half. The dorsal fin contains 7-8 spines and 10-12 soft rays while the anal fin contains 3 spines and 8 soft rays. The spiny part of the dorsal fin has a shorter base than the soft-rayed part. The caudal fin is a truncate. This species has two colour phases, one with black saddles on a whitish background colour with a yellow caudal peduncle and yellow fins is known as the "footballer phase"; the other being a greyish form which has a dark head, five dark saddle markings along the back and small blue spots on body. The juveniles are Batesian mimics of the toxic Valentin's sharpnose puffer (Canthigaster valentini). This species attains a total length of 125 centimetres (49 in), although they are commonly around 84 centimetres (33 in), and a maximum published weight of 24.2 kilograms (53 lb).

== Habitat and biology ==
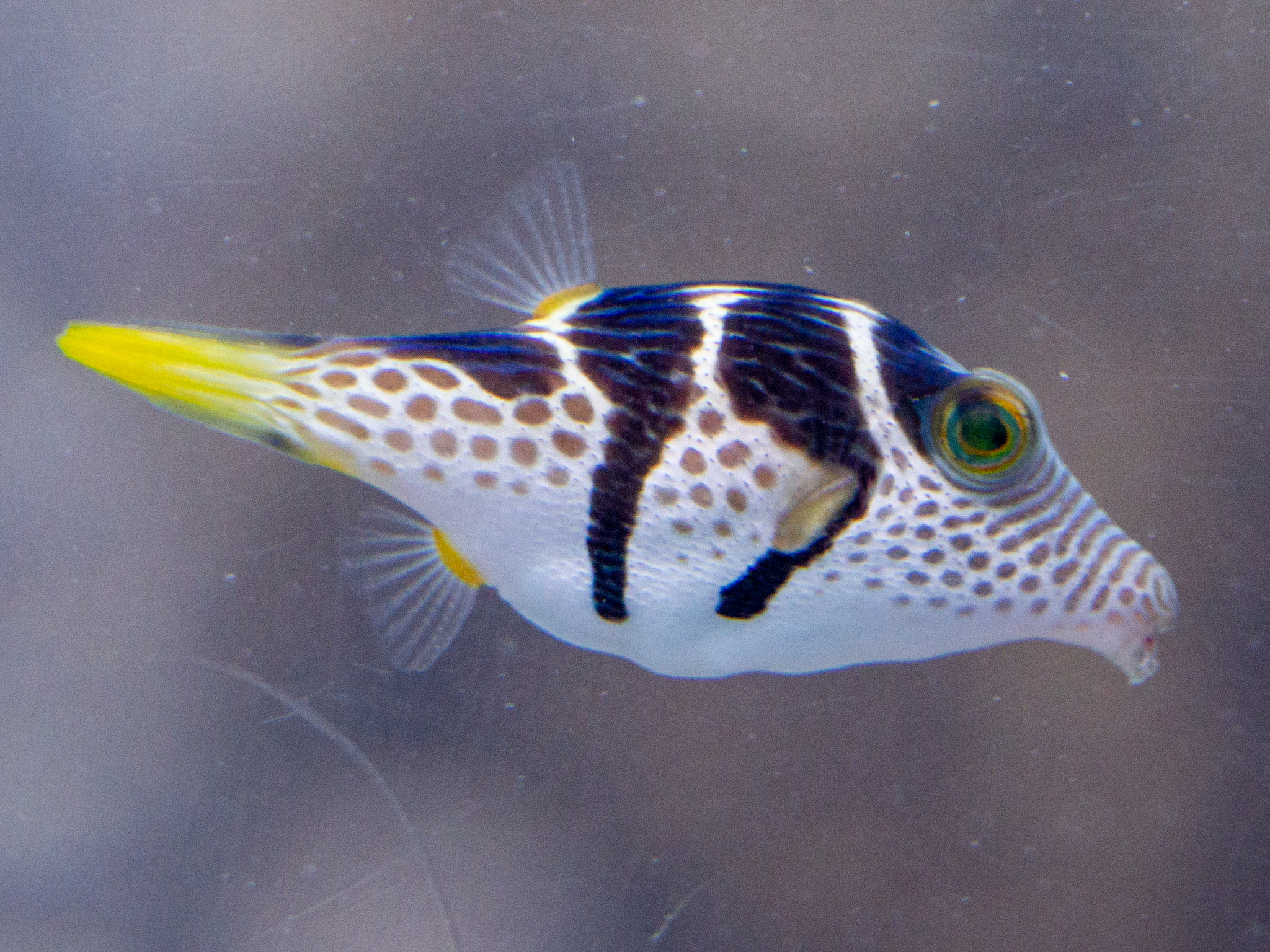
Juvenile P. laevis (right) mimic the toxic pufferfish Canthigaster valentini (left)
At the Marshall Islands
In Fiji

In Queensland

Plectropomus laevis is found in lagoon areas which have good coral cover and the seaward side of reefs where it appears to prefer reef channels and the outer shelf of the reef. It is found at depths between 4 and 100 metres (13 and 328 ft). The juveniles of both colour phases with total length's of less than 20 centimetres (7.9 in) mimic Valentin's sharpnose puffer and usually scull with their pectoral fins for swimming while theyhold the caudal fin folded and the first few spines of the spiny part of the dorsal fin held erect. This species forages over larger areas and a wider depth range than the sympatric Plectropomus leopardus. They are monandric protogynous hermaphrodites, in which the males only develop from mature females, the youngest males found have been 9 years of age and females mature at 2.2 years and at around 40 centimetres (16 in) in fork length. This species is comparatively fast growing and may attain a length of 50 centimetres (20 in) in less than four years and females may be sexually mature in less than three years. They form small spawning aggregations although large aggregations have been recorded from the northern Great Barrier Reef. It is likely that this species spawns in deeper waters on reef fronts compared to P. leopardus and this may be the reason for the lack of spawning observations for P. laevis. The adults feed on a variety of larger reef fishes, including other groupers, while the juveniles feed on smaller fish and invertebrates such as crustaceans and squid.

== Parasites ==
As most fish, this species harbours many parasite species. The diplectanid monogeneans Echinoplectanum laeve and Echinoplectanum chauvetorum are parasites on the gills.

== Utilisation ==
Plectropomus laevis is a prized food fish but their diet dominated by fish means that the consumption of its flesh has been responsible for many instances of ciguatera poisoning. It is caught using hook-and-line, spears and fish traps. It is becoming more important in the live reef food fish trade and it also appears in the aquarium trade.
