= Echinoplectanum leopardi =

Scientific classification
- Kingdom: Animalia
- Phylum: Platyhelminthes
- Class: Monogenea
- Order: Dactylogyridea
- Family: Diplectanidae
- Genus: Echinoplectanum
- Species: E. leopardi

Binomial name
- Echinoplectanum leopardi Justine & Euzet, 2006

Species of flatworm

Echinoplectanum leopardi is a species of diplectanid monogenean parasitic on the gills of the leopard coralgrouper, Plectropomus leopardus. It has been described in 2006.

== Etymology ==
The specific epithet leopardi is the genitive form of leopardus and relates to the type-host.

== Hosts and localities ==
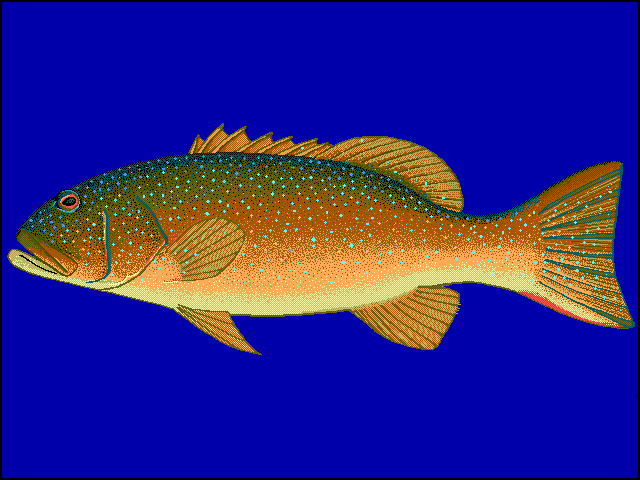
The leopard coralgrouper Plectropomus leopardus is the host of Echinoplectanum leopardi

The leopard coral grouper Plectropomus leopardus is the type-host of Echinoplectanum leopardi. The type-locality is the coral reef off Nouméa, New Caledonia. In New Caledonia, this fish harbours three species of the genus Echinoplectanum, namely E. leopardi, E. pudicum and E. rarum.
