= Echinoplectanum pudicum =

Scientific classification
- Kingdom: Animalia
- Phylum: Platyhelminthes
- Class: Monogenea
- Order: Dactylogyridea
- Family: Diplectanidae
- Genus: Echinoplectanum
- Species: E. pudicum

Binomial name
- Echinoplectanum pudicum Justine & Euzet, 2006

Species of flatworm

Echinoplectanum pudicum is a species of diplectanid monogenean parasitic on the gills of the leopard coralgrouper, Plectropomus leopardus. It has been described in 2006. This species was distinguished from all other species of the genus Echinoplectanum by the shape and small size of its male copulatory organ, and the apparent absence of a sclerotised vagina.

== Etymology ==
The epithet pudicum (Latin for bashful, chaste) refers to the low level of development of the reproductive organs.

== Hosts and localities ==
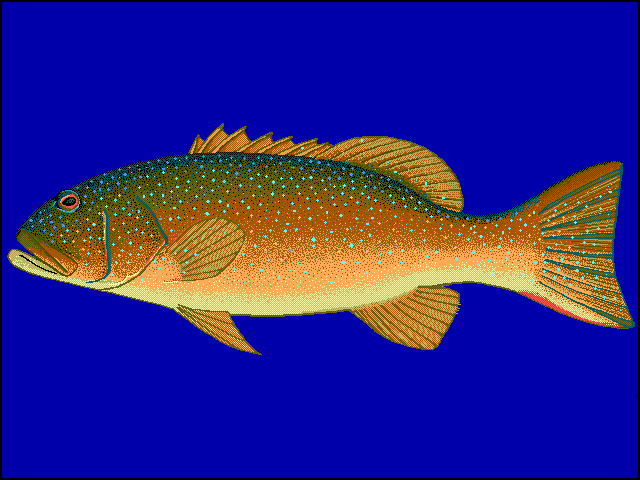
The leopard coralgrouper Plectropomus leopardus is the host of Echinoplectanum pudicum

The leopard coral grouper Plectropomus leopardus is the type-host of Echinoplectanum pudicum. The type-locality is the coral reef off Nouméa, New Caledonia. In New Caledonia, this fish harbours three species of the genus Echinoplectanum, namely E. pudicum, E. rarum and E. leopardi.
