= Echinoplectanum rarum =

Scientific classification
- Kingdom: Animalia
- Phylum: Platyhelminthes
- Class: Monogenea
- Order: Dactylogyridea
- Family: Diplectanidae
- Genus: Echinoplectanum
- Species: E. rarum

Binomial name
- Echinoplectanum rarum Justine & Euzet, 2006

Species of flatworm

Echinoplectanum rarum is a species of diplectanid monogenean parasitic on the gills of the leopard coralgrouper, Plectropomus leopardus. It has been described in 2006. This species is very rare and represented only 2% of the specimens of Echinoplectanum spp. found in P. leopardus. This species was distinguished from other species of the same genus by its characteristic ring-shaped sclerotised vagina.

== Etymology ==
The epithet rarum is Latin for rare.

== Hosts and localities ==
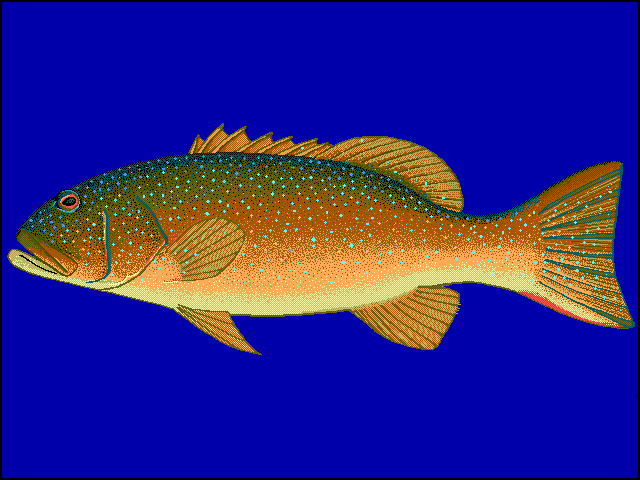
The leopard coralgrouper Plectropomus leopardus is the host of Echinoplectanum rarum

The leopard coral grouper Plectropomus leopardus is the type-host of Echinoplectanum rarum. The type-locality is the coral reef off Nouméa, New Caledonia. In New Caledonia, this fish harbours three species of the genus Echinoplectanum, namely E. rarum, E. pudicum and E. leopardi.
