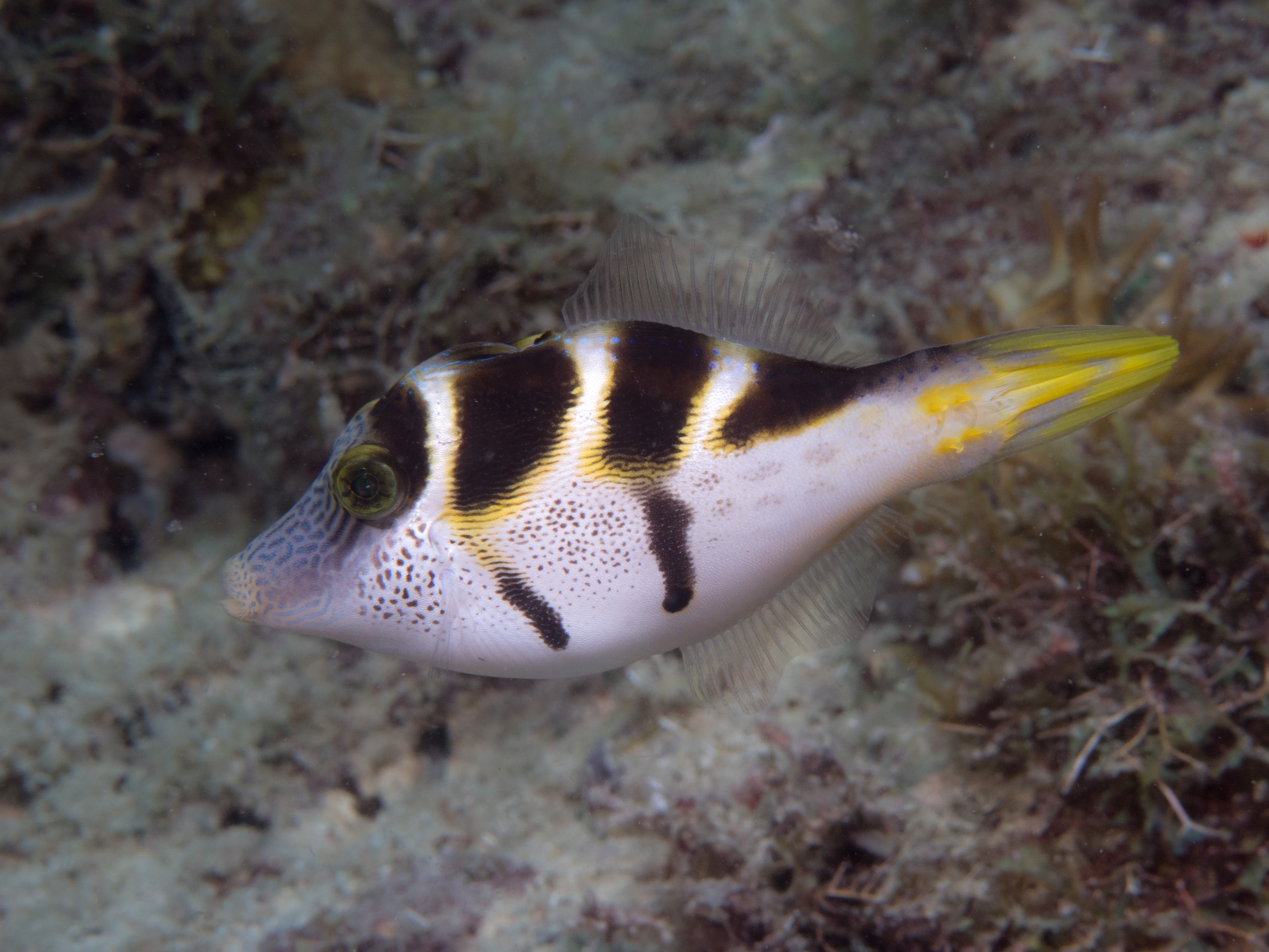

Scientific classification
- Kingdom: Animalia
- Phylum: Chordata
- Class: Actinopterygii
- Division: Teleostei
- Order: Tetraodontiformes
- Family: Monacanthidae
- Genus: Paraluteres
- Species: P. prionurus

Binomial name
- Paraluteres prionurus (Bleeker, 1851)

= Blacksaddle filefish =

Species of fish

The blacksaddle filefish, Paraluteres prionurus, is a filefish of the family Monacanthidae. It reaches a length of a maximum 11 cm.

The blacksaddle filefish are found in pairs or in small schools and inhabit reefs across the Indian and Pacific oceans.

Coloration is sandy to grey with distinctive black "saddles" on the back and a yellow tail.

== Mimicry ==
The blacksaddle filefish is a Batesian mimic of the highly toxic pufferfish Canthigaster valentini, which is commonly found where ever P. prionurus is found. The two species have been known to school together.

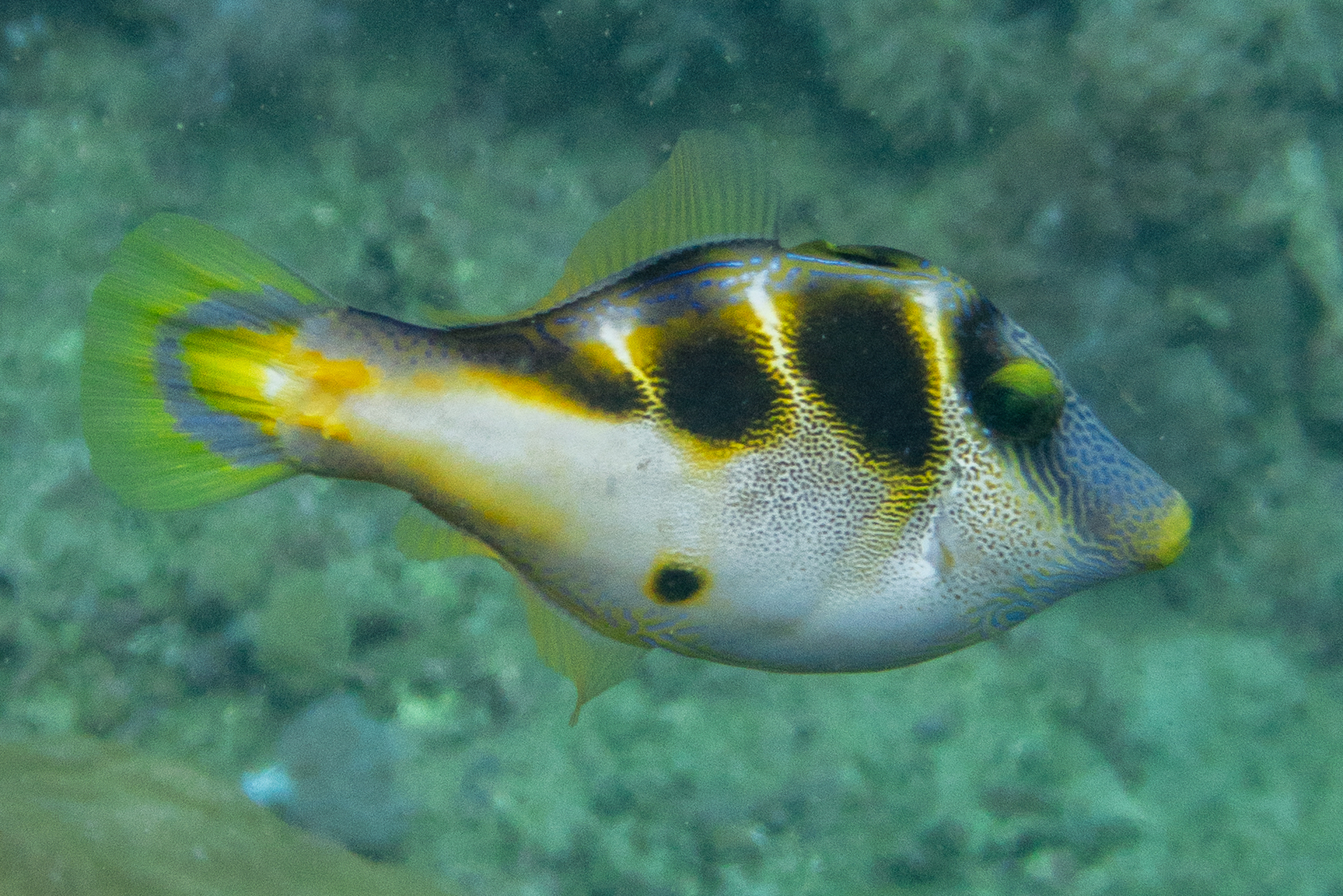
Blacksaddle filefish (Paraluteres prionurus)

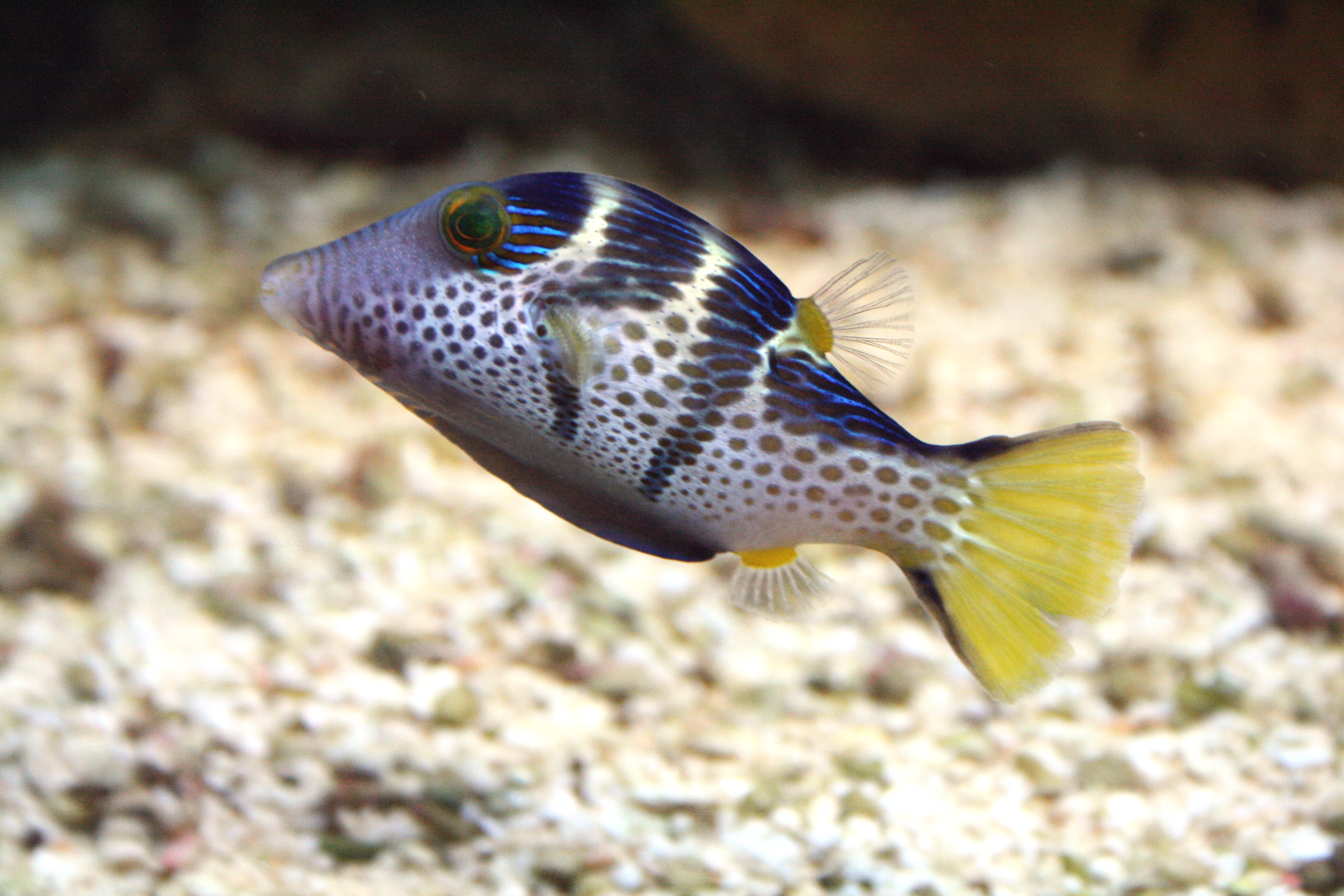
Black-saddled toby (Canthigaster valentini)

== Gallery ==
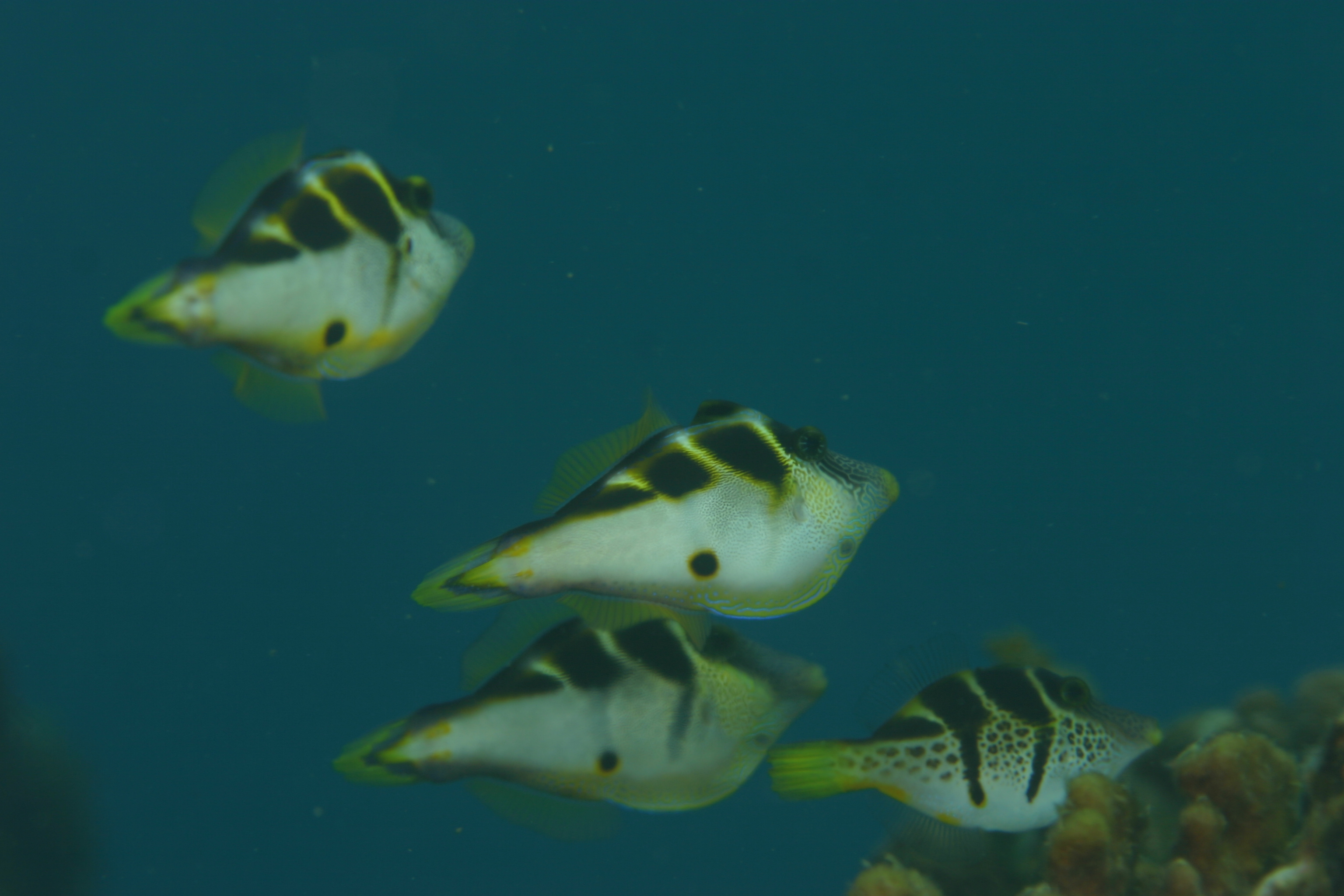
Three black saddle filefish with a black-saddled toby

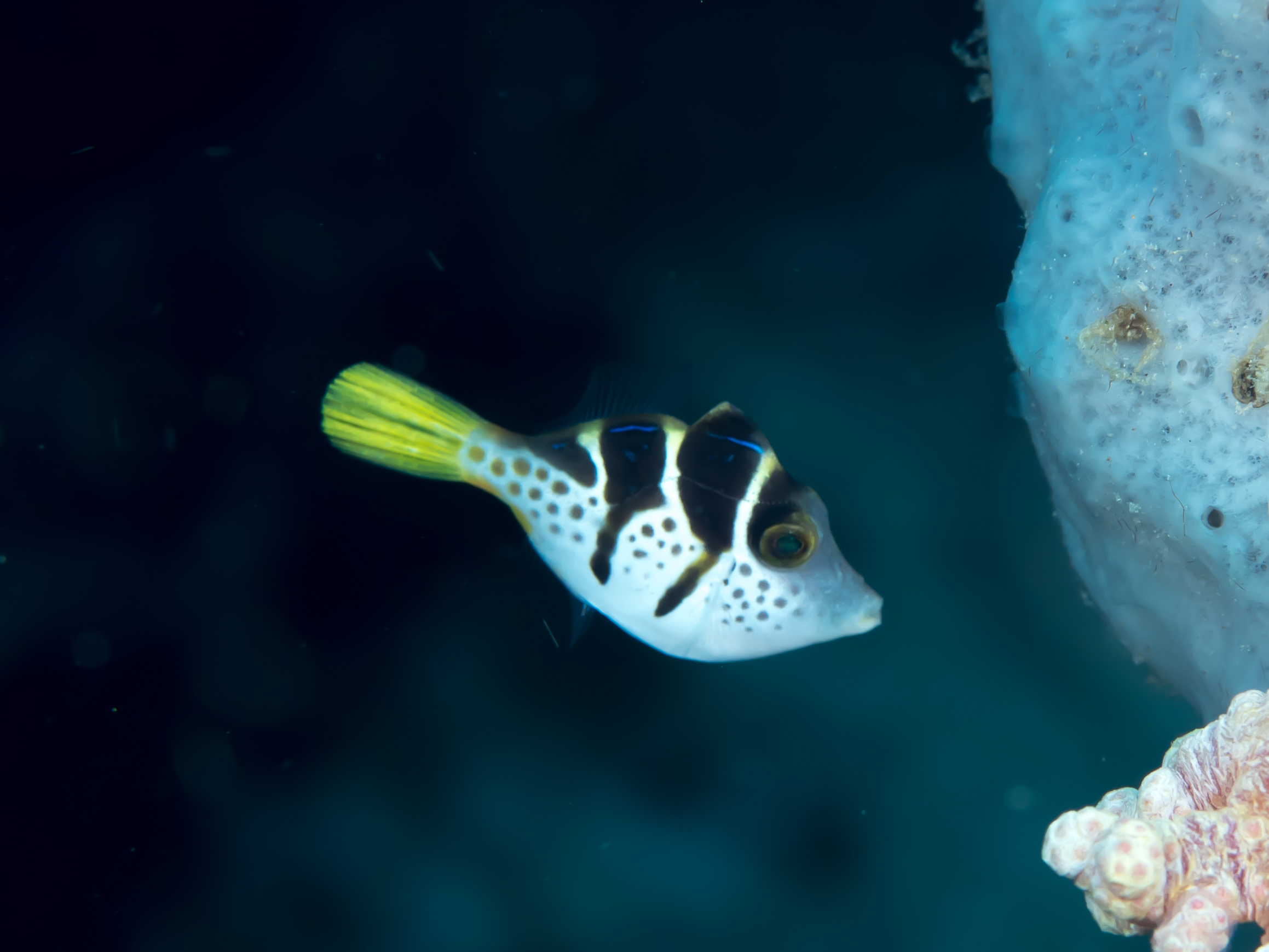
Juvenile

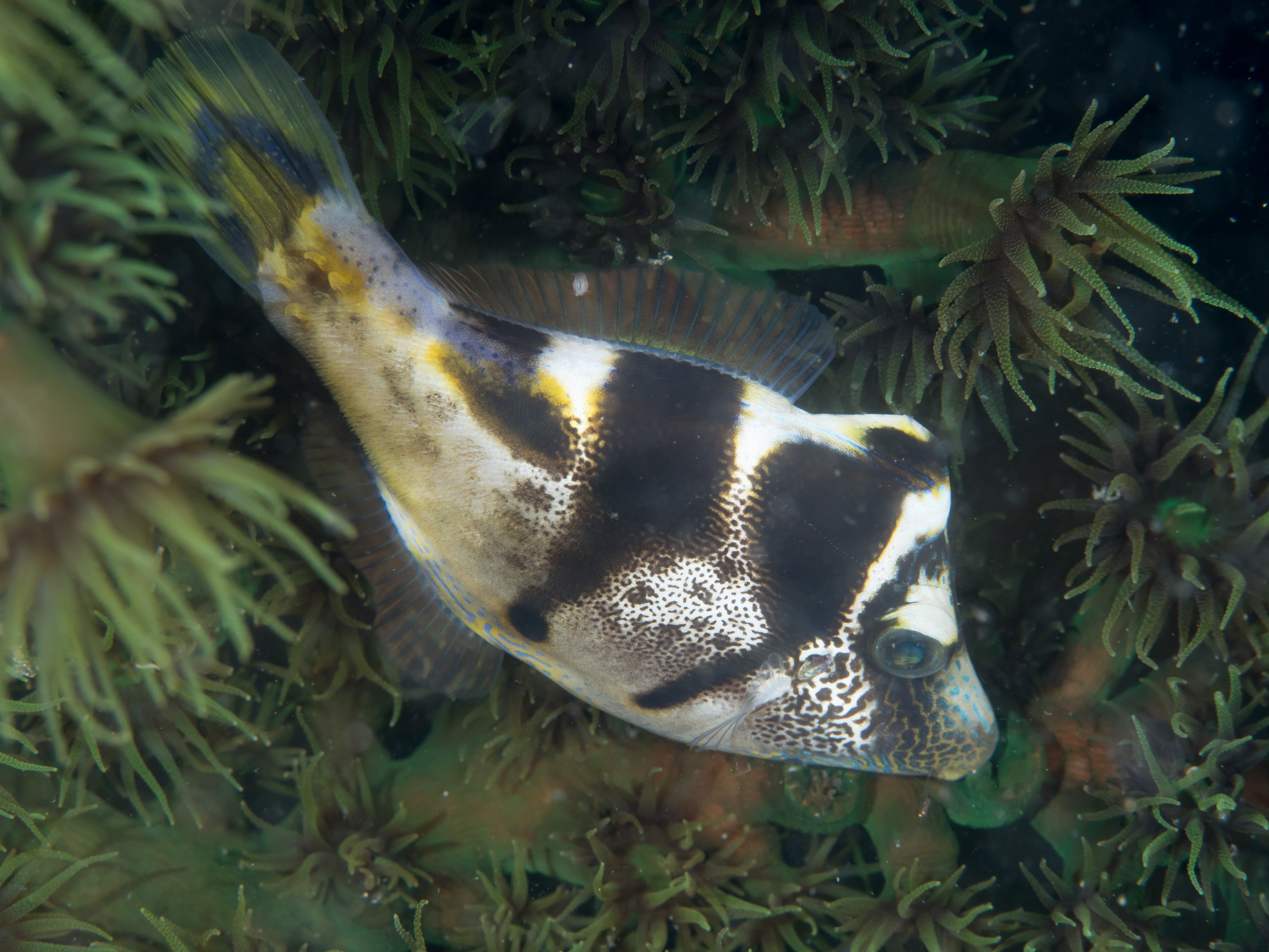

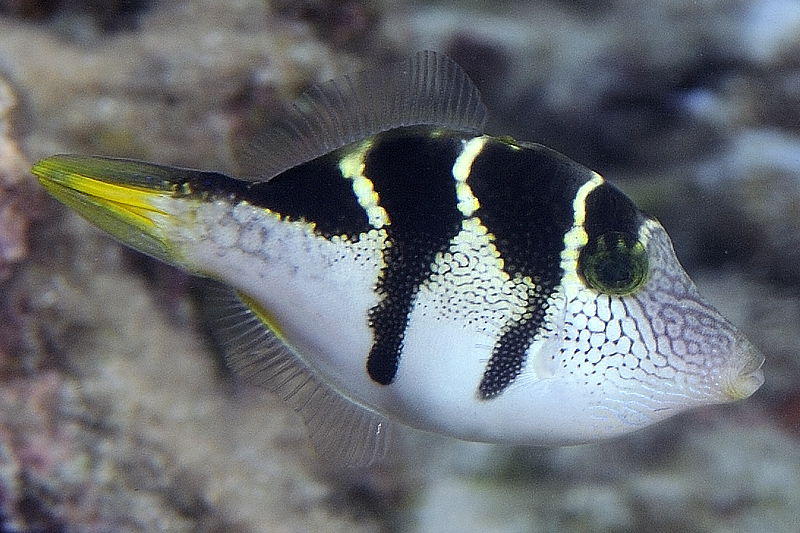
Young female

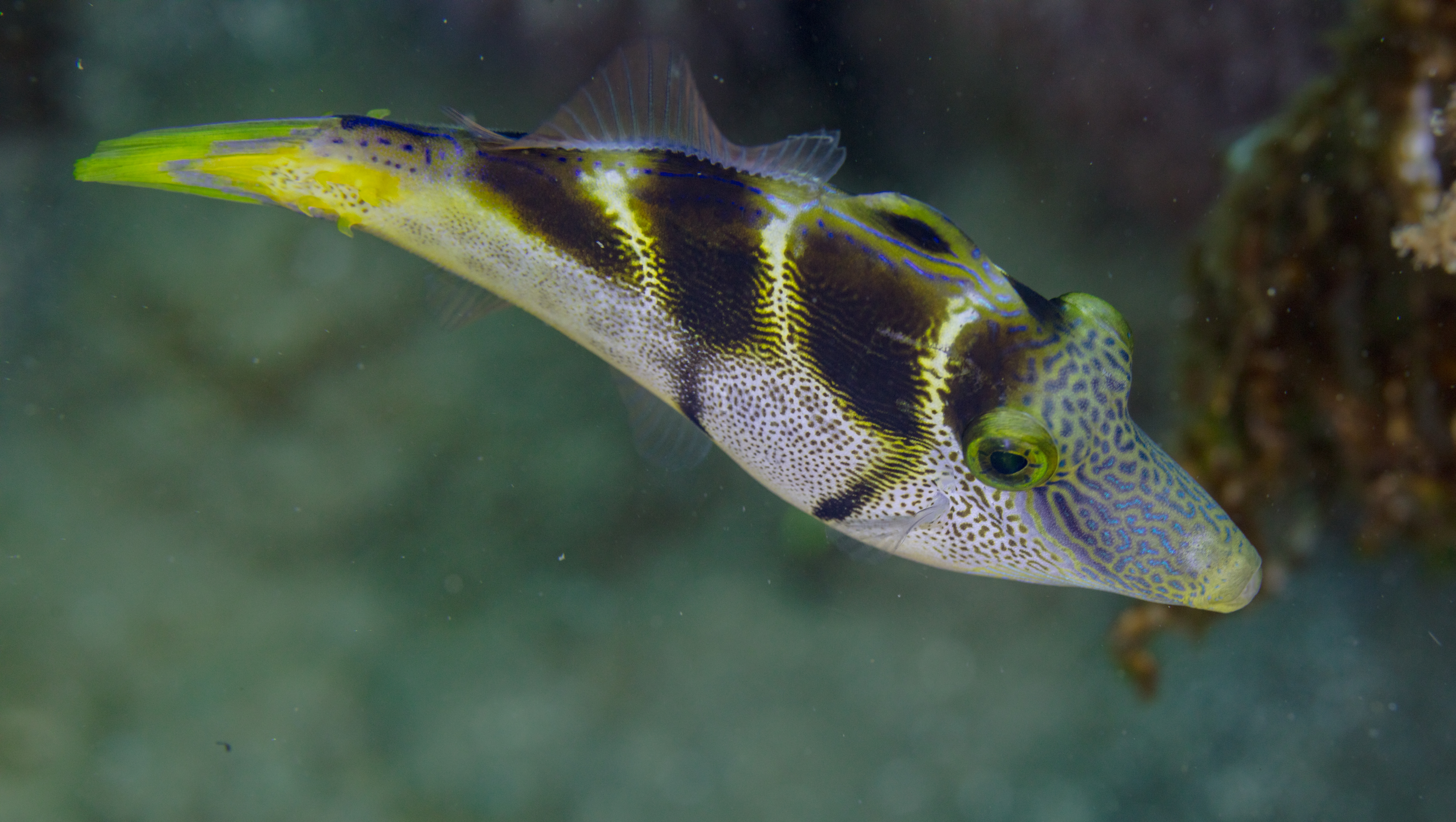

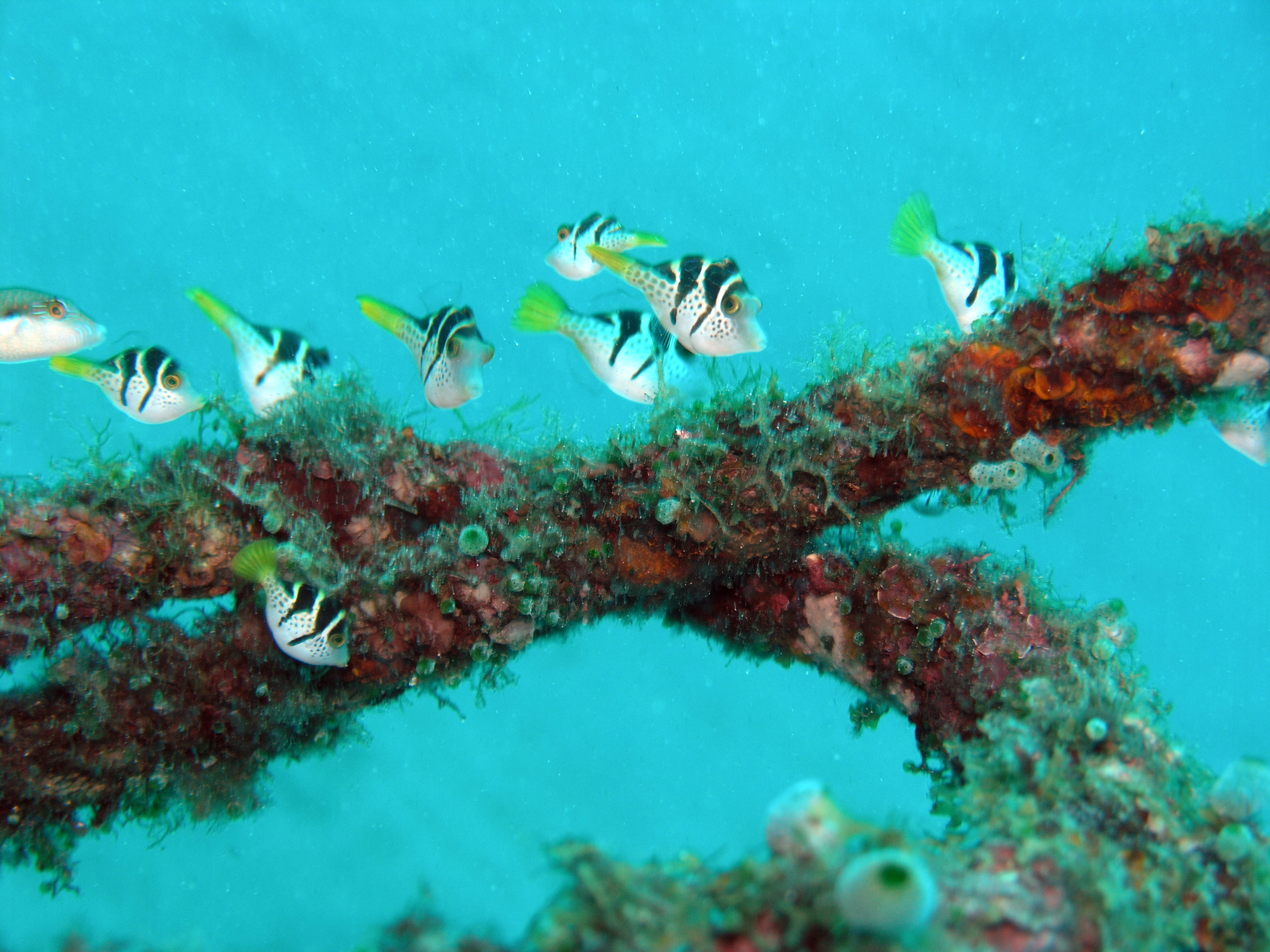

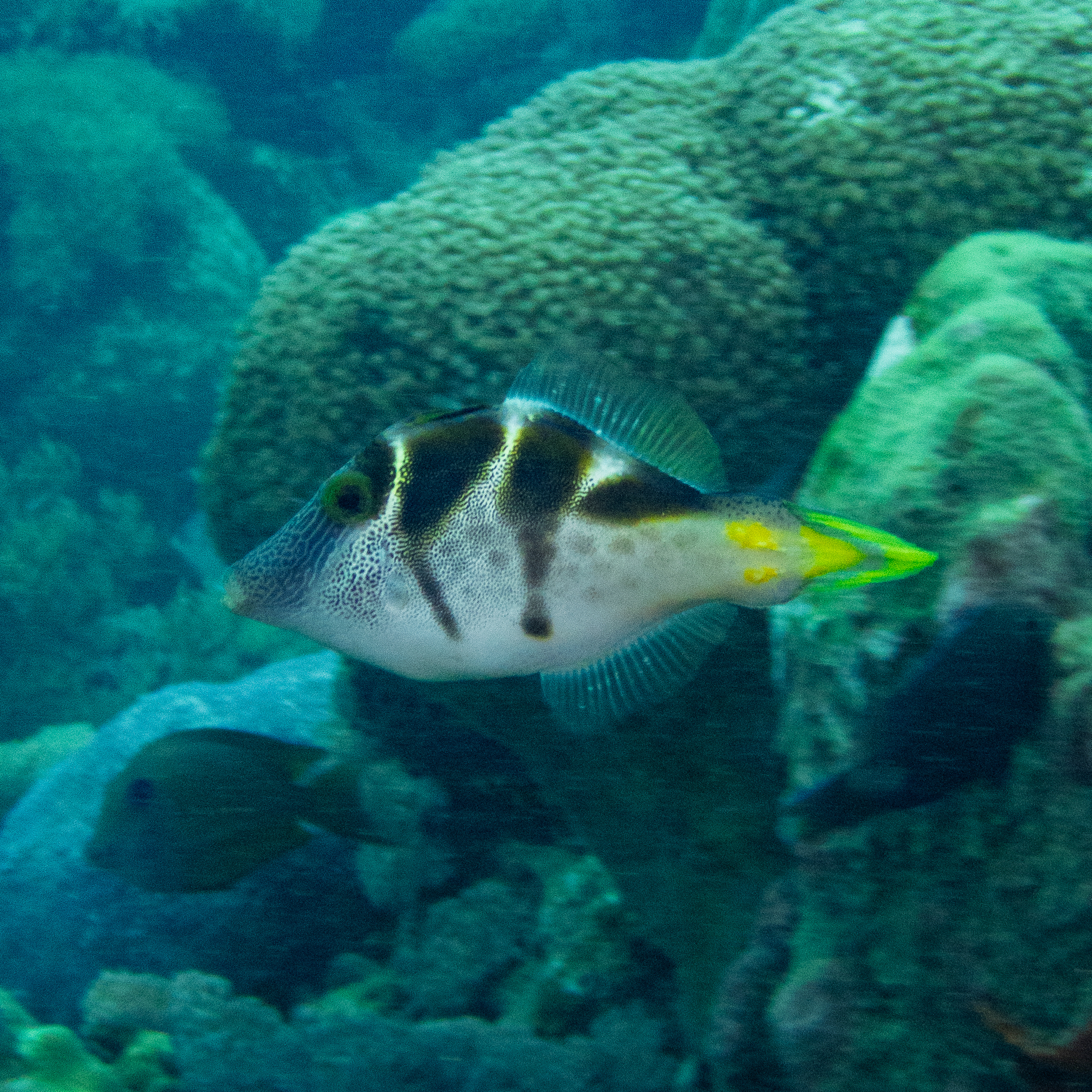

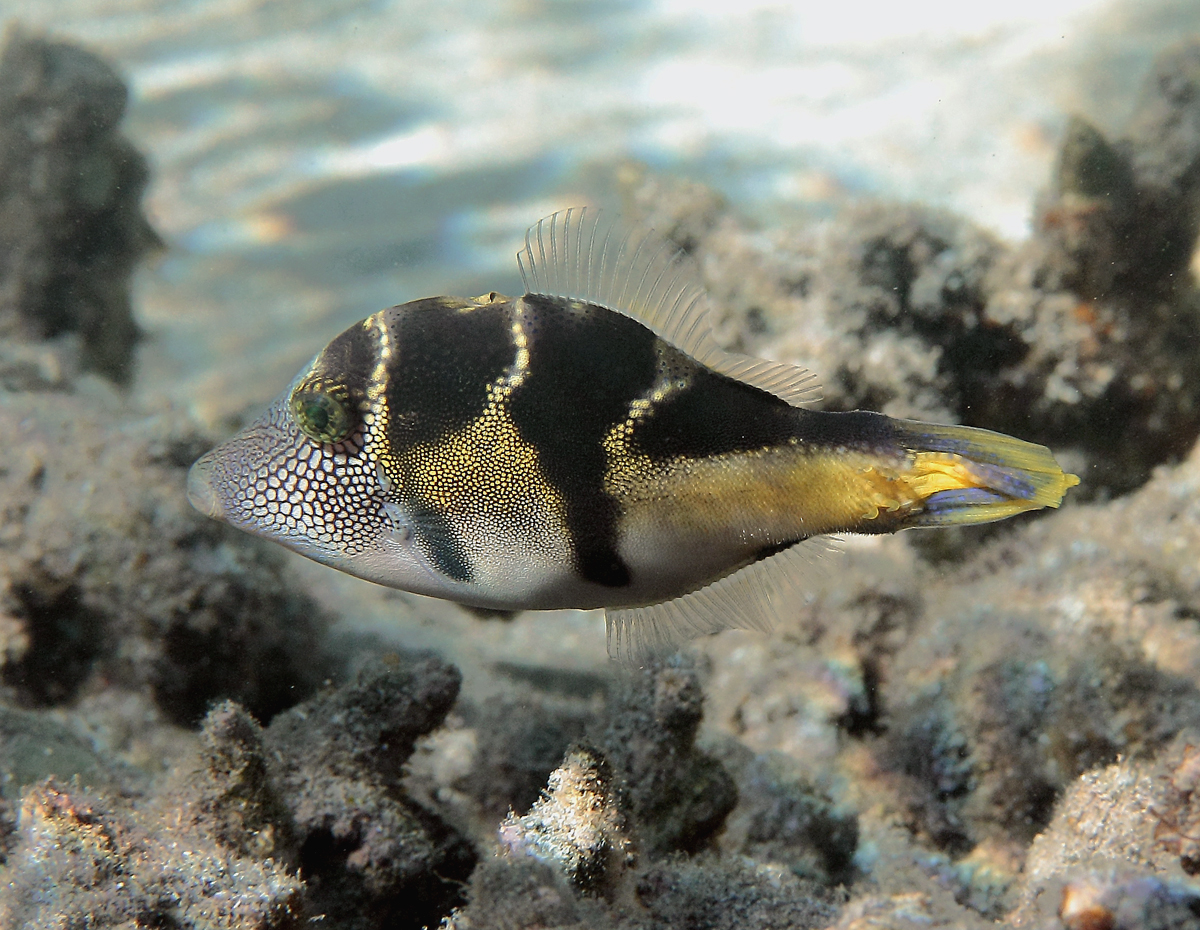
