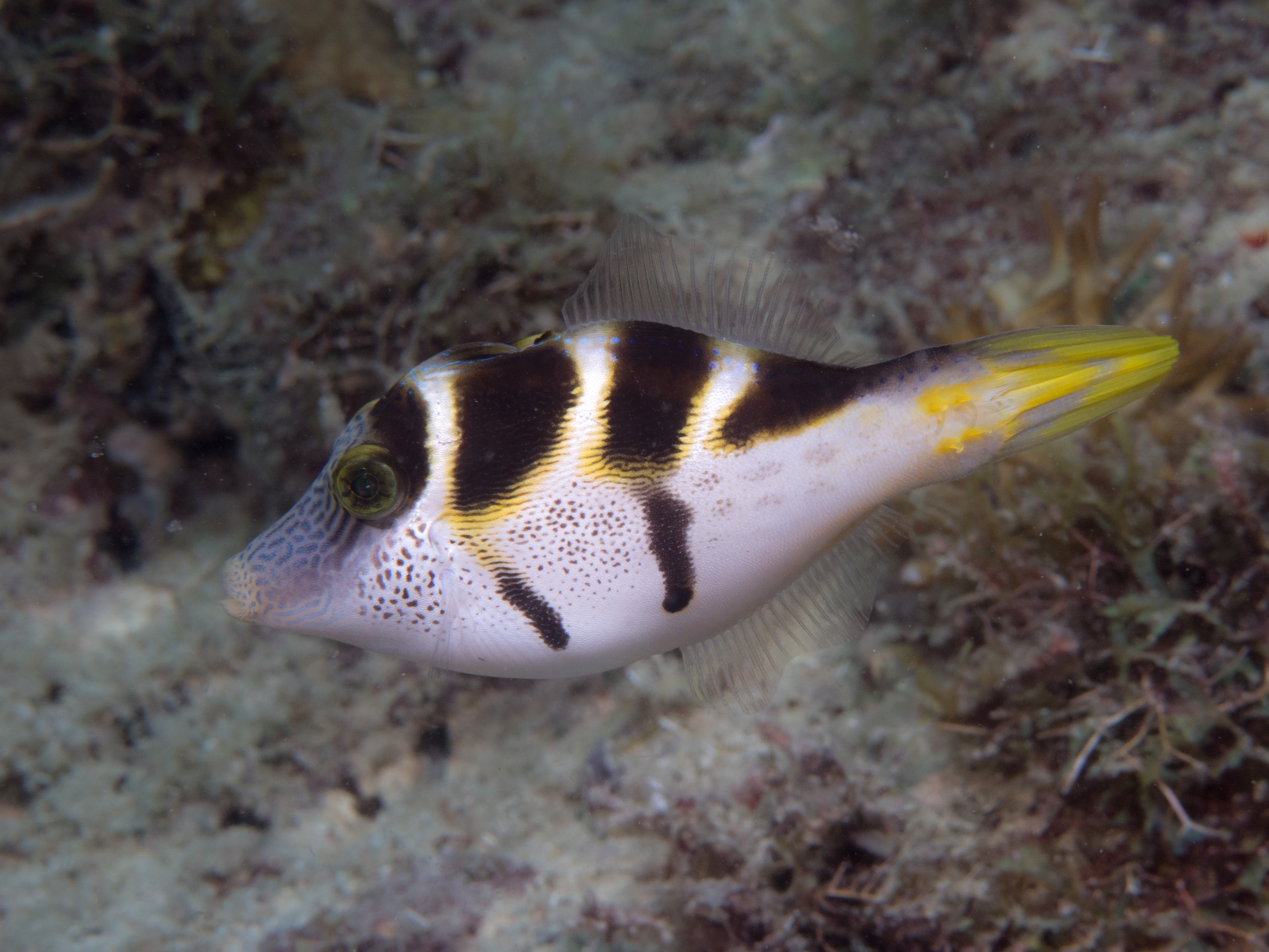
- Paraluteres prionurus

Scientific classification
- Kingdom: Animalia
- Phylum: Chordata
- Class: Actinopterygii
- Order: Tetraodontiformes
- Family: Monacanthidae
- Genus: Paraluteres; Bleeker, 1865

= Paraluteres =

Genus of fishes

Paraluteres is a genus of filefishes native to the Indian and Pacific Oceans.

== Species ==
There are currently 2 recognized species in this genus:

- Paraluteres arqat E. Clark & Gohar, 1953
- Paraluteres prionurus Bleeker, 1851 (false puffer)
