= Echinoplectanum chauvetorum =

Scientific classification
- Kingdom: Animalia
- Phylum: Platyhelminthes
- Class: Monogenea
- Order: Dactylogyridea
- Family: Diplectanidae
- Genus: Echinoplectanum
- Species: E. chauvetorum

Binomial name
- Echinoplectanum chauvetorum Justine & Euzet, 2006

Species of flatworm

Echinoplectanum chauvetorum is a species of diplectanid monogenean parasitic on the gills of the black-saddled coralgrouper, Plectropomus laevis. It has been described in 2006.

== Etymology ==
Justine & Euzet wrote that the species was named “for Professor Claude Chauvet, a specialist of grouper biology, and his wife Gisèle Chauvet, who kindly provided, among many other fish, several of the fish hosts used in this study”.

== Hosts and localities ==
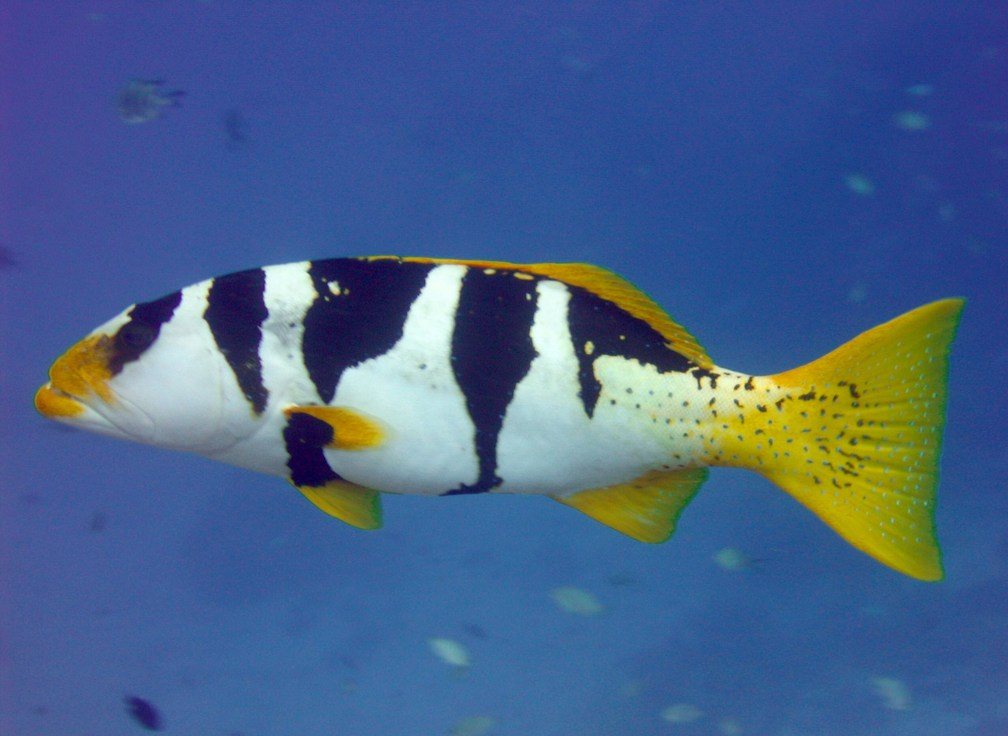
The black-saddled coral grouper Plectropomus laevis is the host of Echinoplectanum chauvetorum

The black-saddled coral grouper Plectropomus laevis is the type-host of Echinoplectanum chauvetorum. The type-locality is the coral reef off Nouméa, New Caledonia.
