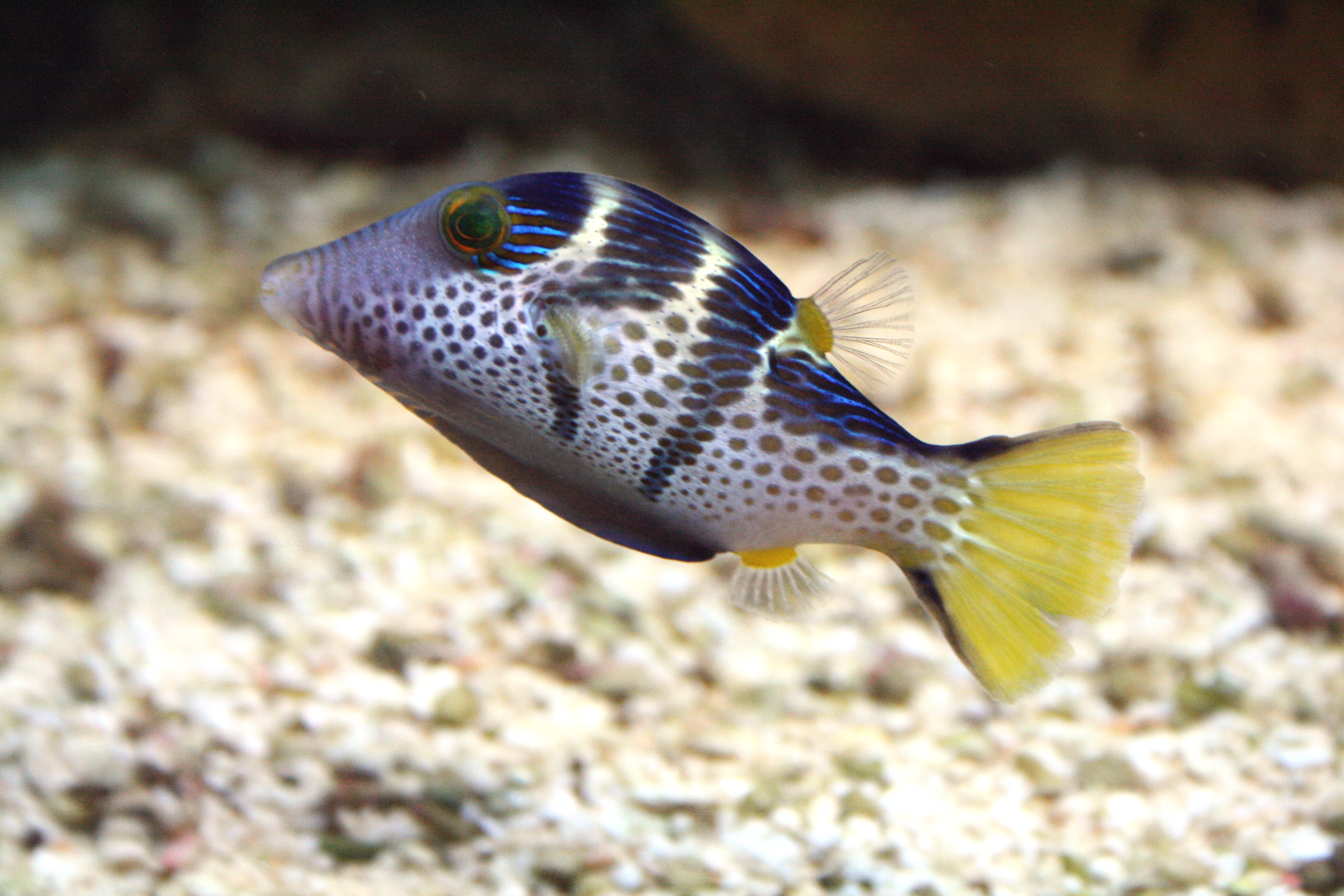

Conservation status
- Least Concern (IUCN 3.1)

Scientific classification
- Kingdom: Animalia
- Phylum: Chordata
- Class: Actinopterygii
- Division: Teleostei
- Order: Tetraodontiformes
- Family: Tetraodontidae
- Genus: Canthigaster
- Species: C. valentini

Binomial name
- Canthigaster valentini (Bleeker, 1853)

= Valentin's sharpnose puffer =

Species of fish

Valentin's sharpnose puffer (Canthigaster valentini), also known as the saddled puffer or black saddled toby, is a demersal marine fish belonging to the family Tetraodontidae. The saddled puffer is a small sized fish which grows up to 11 cm. It is widely distributed throughout the tropical and subtropical waters of the Indian Ocean, Red Sea included, and until the oceanic islands of the Pacific Ocean. It inhabits rocky and coral reefs, lagoons and external reef until 55 m. Canthigaster valentini has a diurnal activity.

Canthigaster valentini has four distinct black stripes (saddles) on its back. The head is blue-grey and the main body is white speckled with blue-grey spots. The tail and fins show hints of yellow and there is a rainbow streak of color behind the eyes. It is omnivorous, it feeds on filamentous green and red algae, tunicates, and on smaller amounts of corals, bryozoans, polychaetes, echinoderms, mollusks, and brown and coralline red algae.

Valentinni's sharpnose puffers are highly poisonous to eat. They are occasionally found in schools together with Paraluteres prionurus, a non-toxic filefish which has evolved to mimic the very toxic C. valentini for protection against predators.

== Etymology ==
The puffer was named in honor of Dutch naturalist François Valentijn (1666–1727).

== Social groupings ==
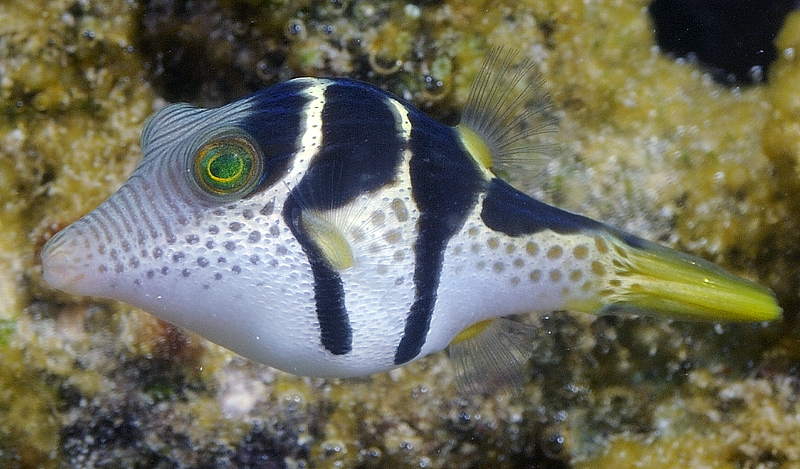
At Reunion

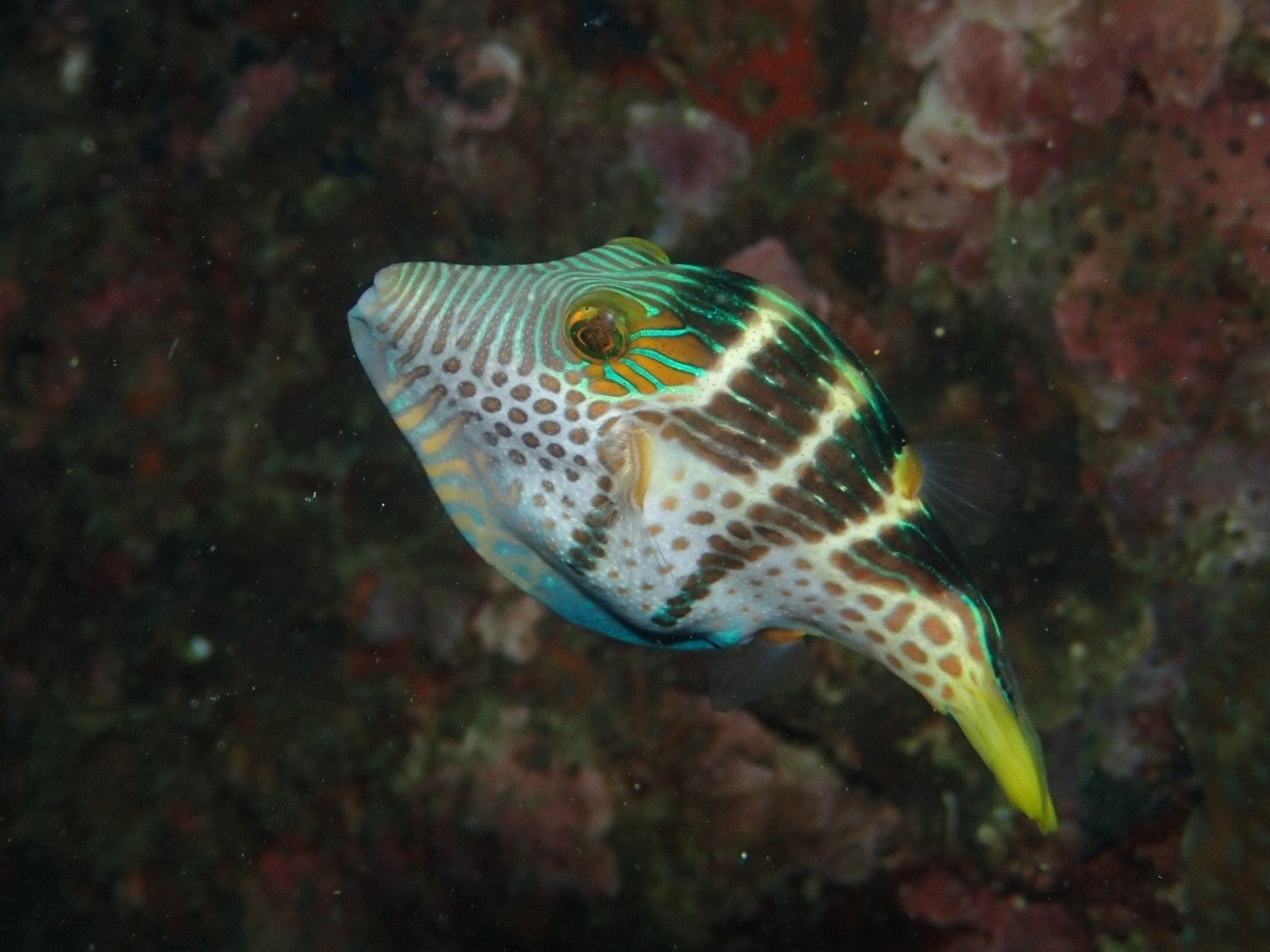
Displaying male

Canthigaster valentini organize themselves into harems dominated by one mature territorial male and containing one or more territorial females. There may also be some immature individuals of either sex present in the dominant male's territory. Each female has her own respective domain within the territorial male's. Bachelor males, males who are sexually mature but do not inhabit a territory of their own with females, are either wanderers or live near another social group. These social groups, though male dominated, were found to be defined by the female fish living within the male's territory. Whenever a mature female dies or is in any way removed, the mature male's territory shrinks to include only the domains of the living females. When a male is removed, females remain territorial, though a bachelor male will most likely takeover any territory left undefended by a territorial male.

== Reproductive behavior ==
Canthigaster valentini are gonochoric, approximately half of the population being male and the other half being female, distinguishable by external characteristics. Dominant males breed exclusively with the females in their territory and maintain territorial boundaries. C. valentini's eggs are demersal, attached to algae on coral rubble. Females can lay anywhere between fifteen and over 800 eggs at a time every four to ten days depending on the season. Spawning generally occurs between 8:00AM and 3:30PM year-round. After eggs are laid, no parental care is required because eggs are unpalatable and, thus, reasonably safe from predation. It was found that predatory fish would rarely attempt to eat the eggs of C. valentini and when eggs were ingested they would be quickly egested. This allows females and males to maintain their territory without the necessity of protecting their eggs as well.

== Eggs and larvae ==
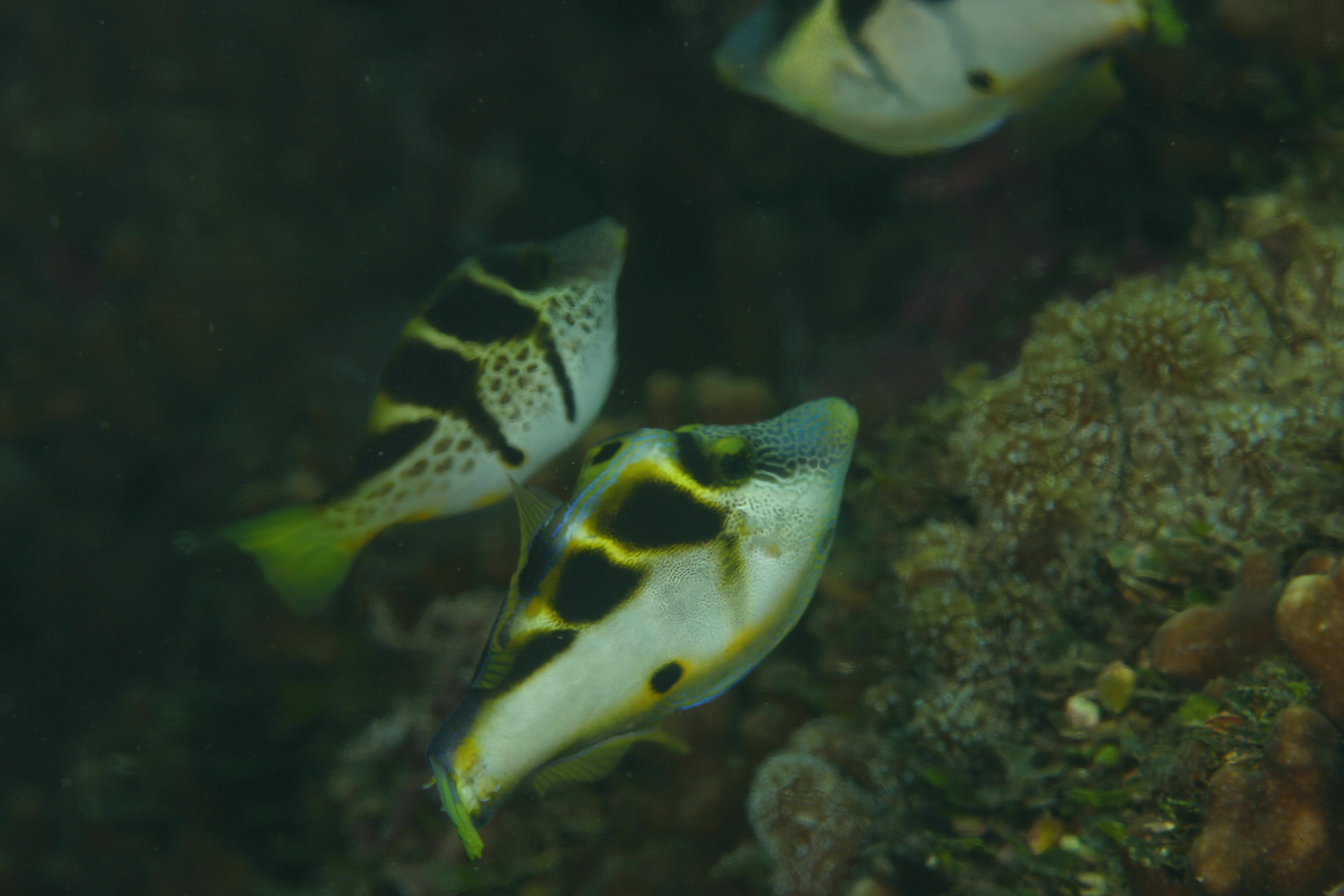
Blacksaddle filefish (foreground) with black-saddled toby (background)

Canthigaster valentini eggs range in size between 0.68 and 0.72 mm in diameter, making them some of the smallest in the family Tetraodontidae. Eggs are spherical with nine radial layers, the outermost layer possessing strong adhesive properties. After incubating for between three and five days, a relatively long incubation period for tetraodontids, C. valentini hatch around sunset at which point larvae measure between 1.30 and 1.40 mm standard length. C. valenitini's most rapid growth occurs in the 24 hours after they are hatched. Growth rate then declines as fish get larger. Upon hatching, larvae begin a pelagic phase that lasts between 64 and 113 days. After settlement on reefs, C. valentini are considered juveniles, having a much more robust body shape.

== Toxicity ==
The toxin found in C. valentini as well as in other pufferfish species is one of the most potent naturally occurring toxins. It is a neurotoxin called tetrodotoxin present in the skin and other tissues of C. valentini. It is lethal to many species of fish, thus making C. valentini unpalatable to predators. Threat of predation for adults as well as larvae and eggs is low due to unpalatability, causing reproductive behaviors to differ from other species according to the reduced predation risk.

=== Mimicry model ===
Their toxic skin makes C. valentini a model for Batesian mimicry, specifically by the filefish species Paraluteres prionurus which is similarly colored, allowing it to benefit from C. valentini's low risk of predation. It is also mimicked by juveniles of the grouper Plectropomus laevis.

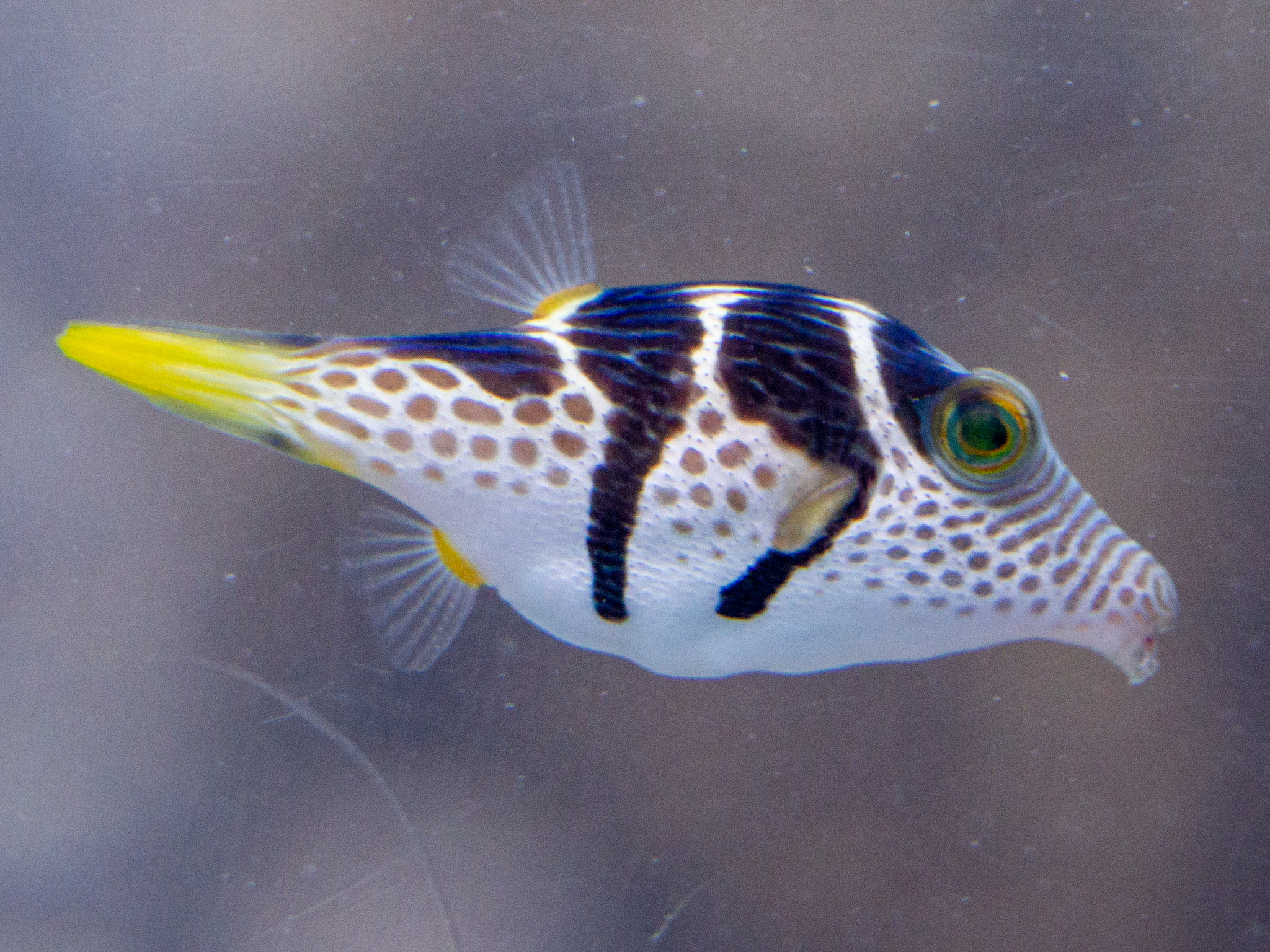
Black-saddled toby (Canthigaster valentini)

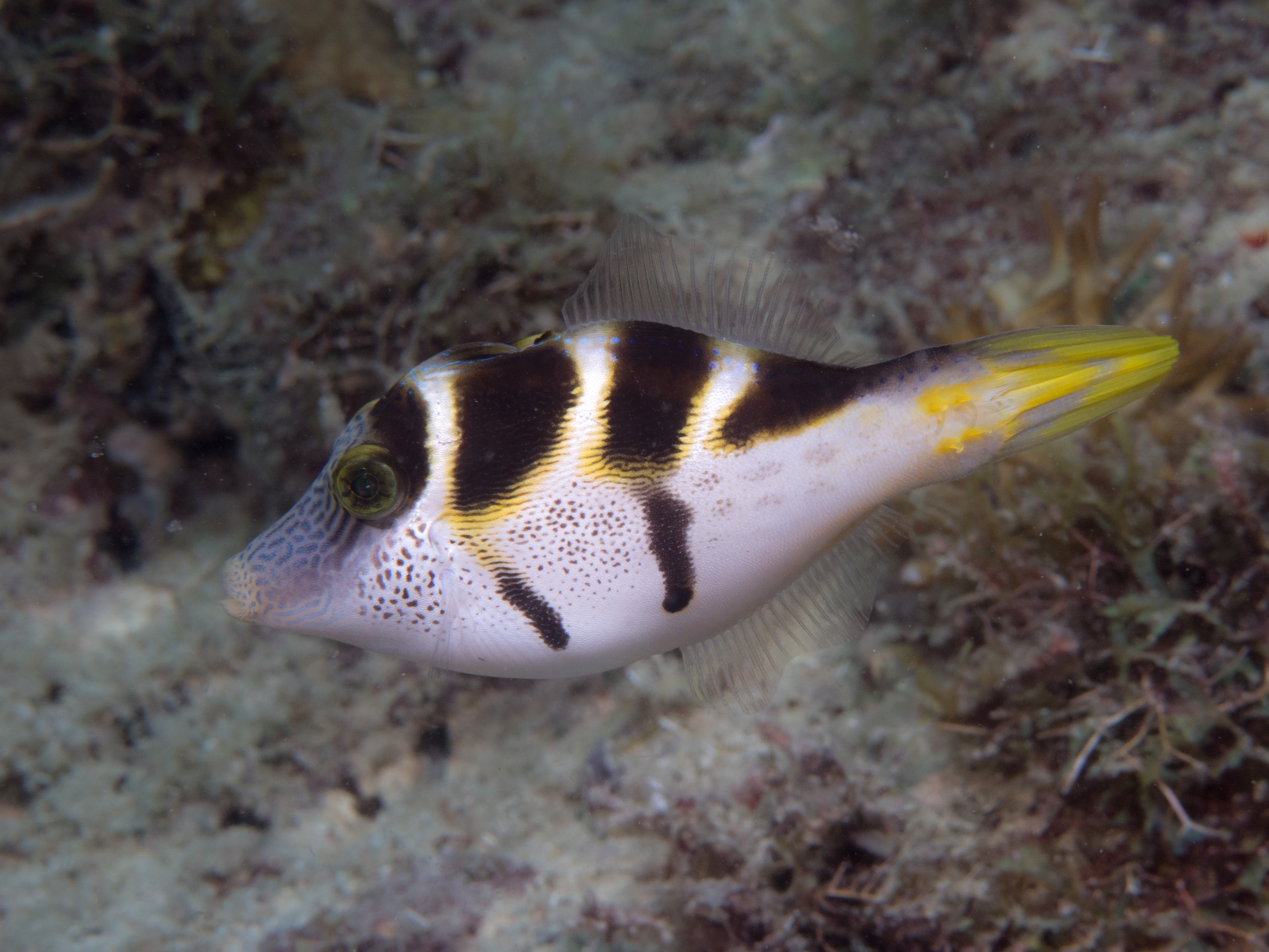
Blacksaddle filefish (Paraluteres prionurus)

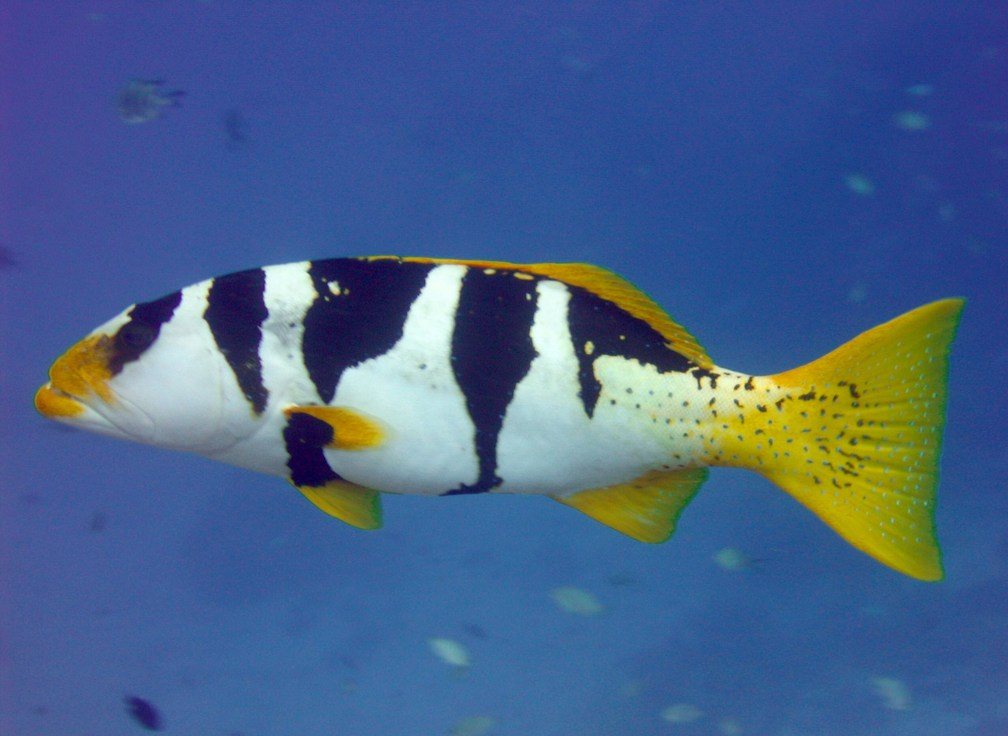
Juvenile blacksaddled coral grouper (Plectropomus laevis)

== Inflation response ==
Besides their toxicity, C. valentini have other mechanisms for evading predation. Pufferfish, as their name indicates, have the ability to 'puff' themselves up in order to intimidate predators. This is accomplished by filling a distensible stomach with water through rapid gulping which can increase their size to three or four times their original volume. Pufferfish must be capable of maintaining inflation for up to ten minutes in order to outlast the attention span of their predators. It was once thought that pufferfish held their breath in order to display this behavior. A 2014 study, however, found that oxygen consumption actually increases while fish are inflated. It had been previously understood that respiration through the gills ceased during inflation while cutaneous respiration increased, but this study found that cutaneous respiration is nearly nonexistent, and oxygen intake through the gills is almost five times higher than normal while C. valentini is inflated.

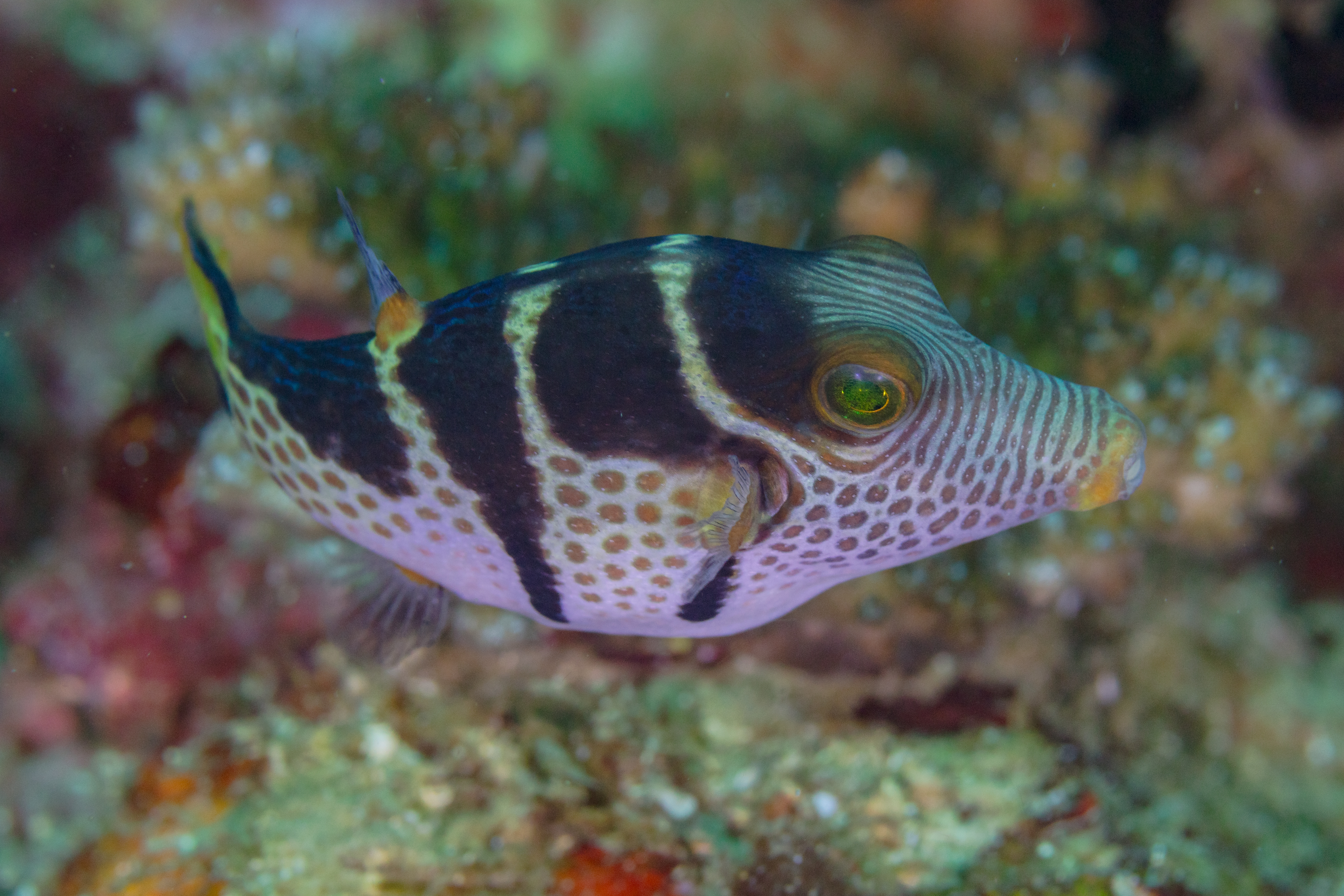

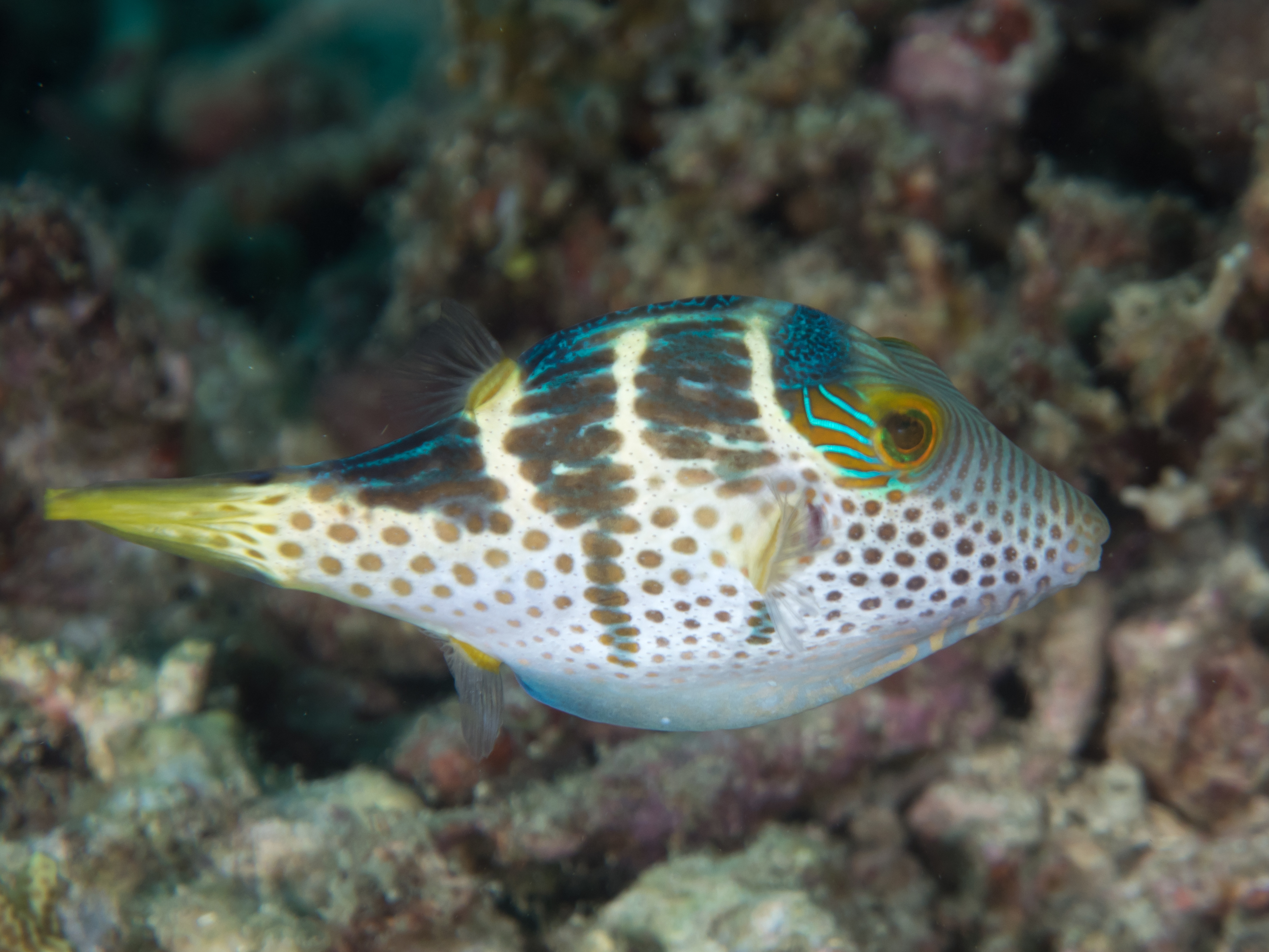

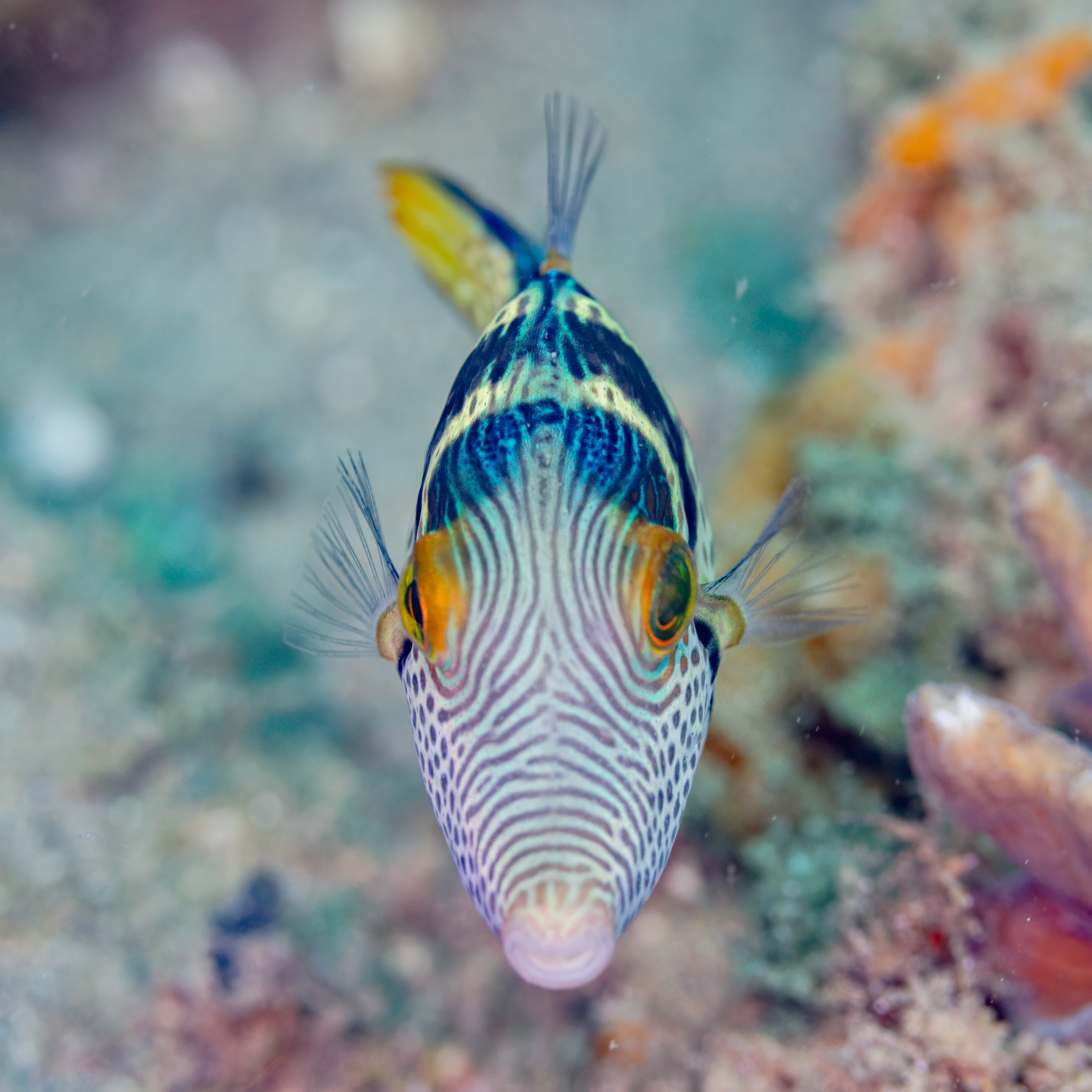

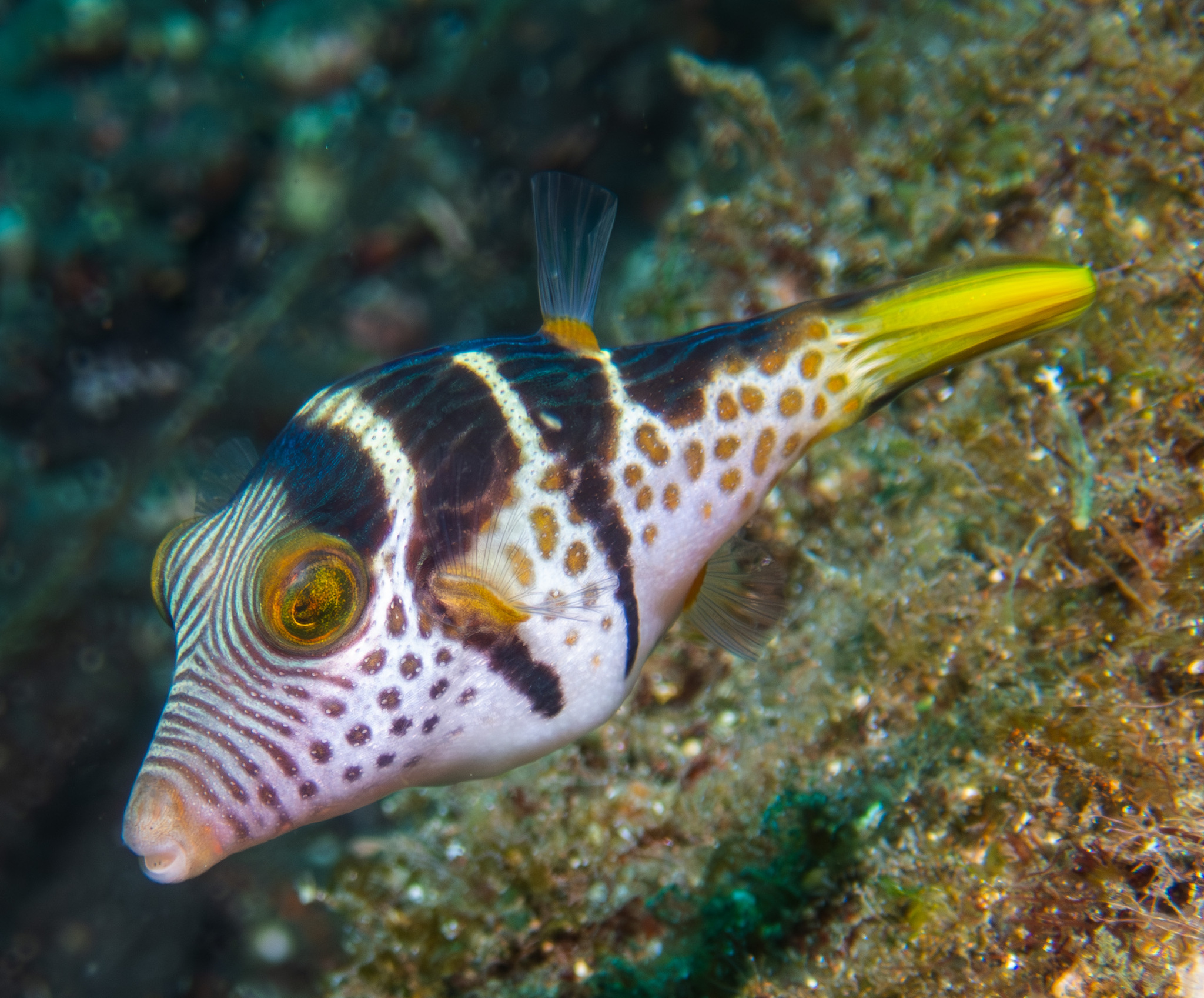

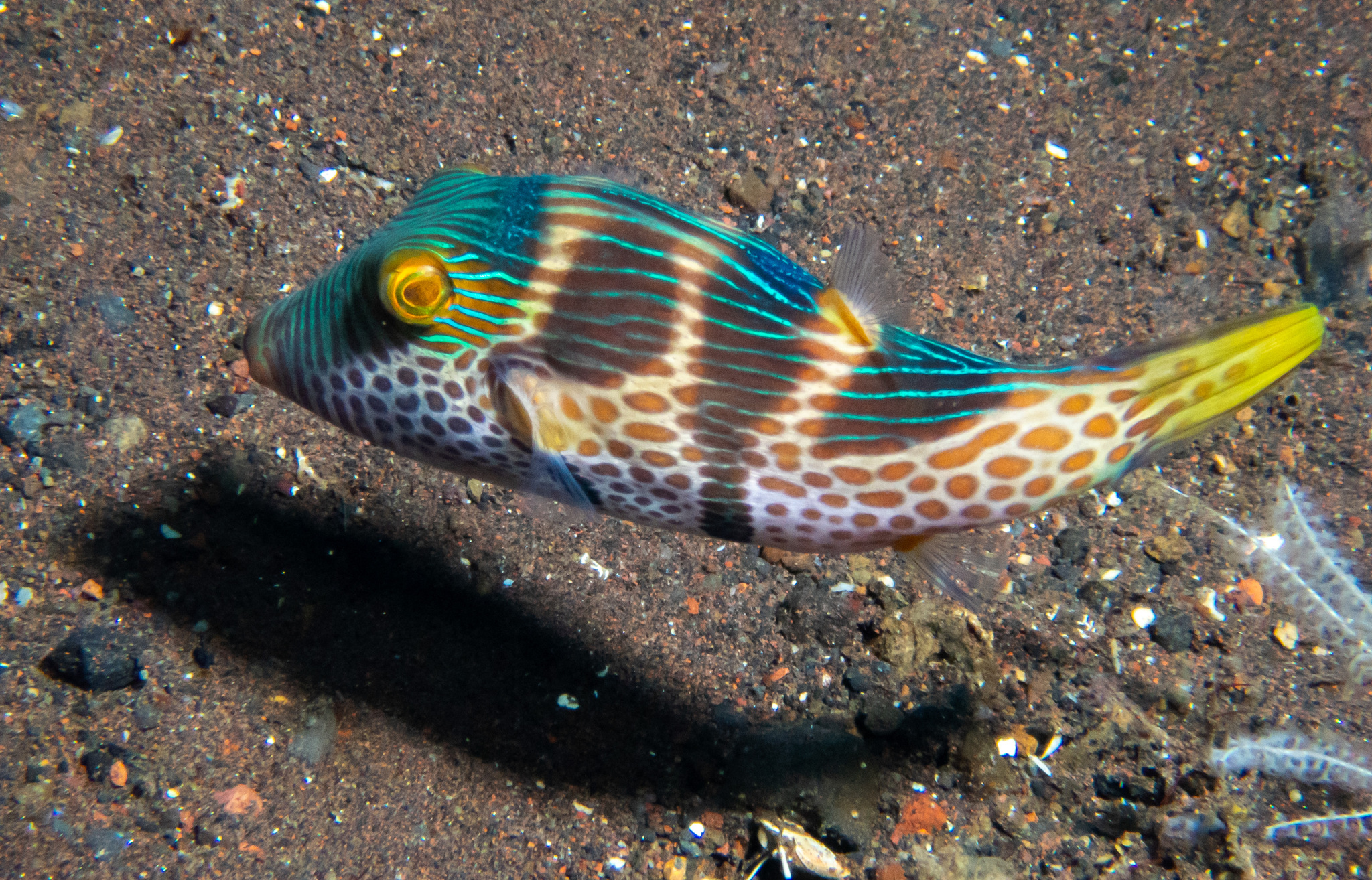
