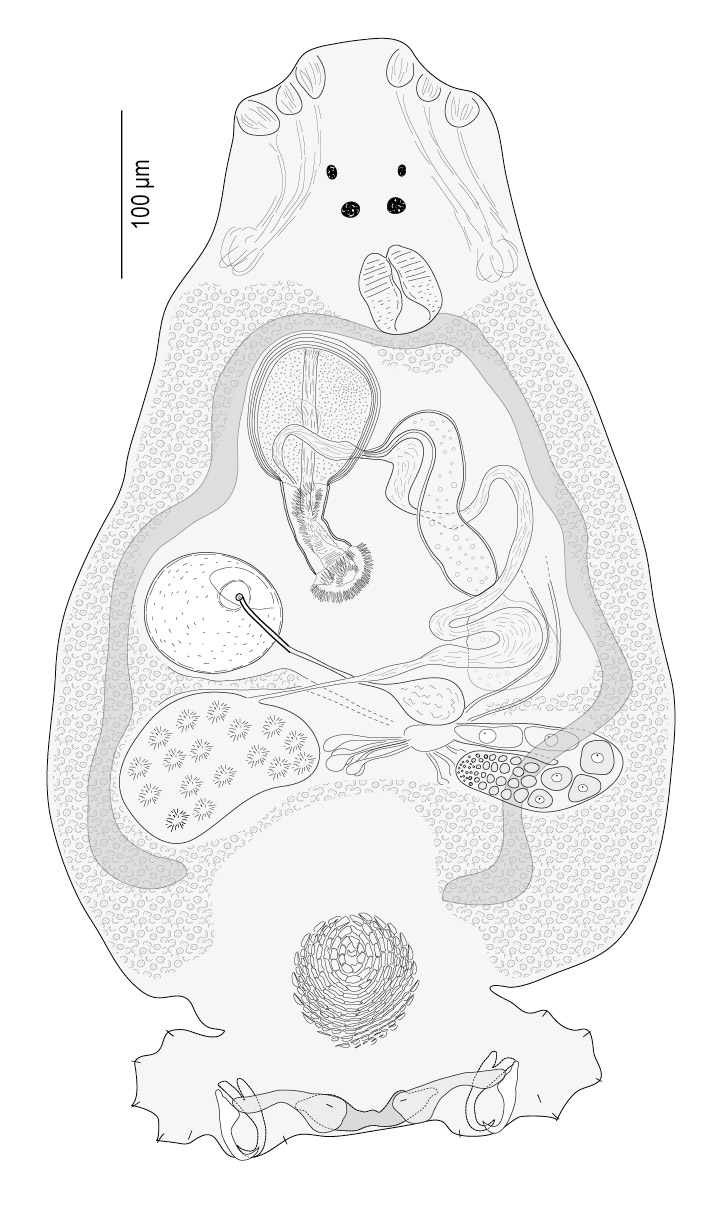
- Echinoplectanum laeve

Scientific classification
- Kingdom: Animalia
- Phylum: Platyhelminthes
- Class: Monogenea
- Order: Dactylogyridea
- Family: Diplectanidae
- Genus: Echinoplectanum; Justine & Euzet, 2006

= Echinoplectanum =

Genus of flatworms

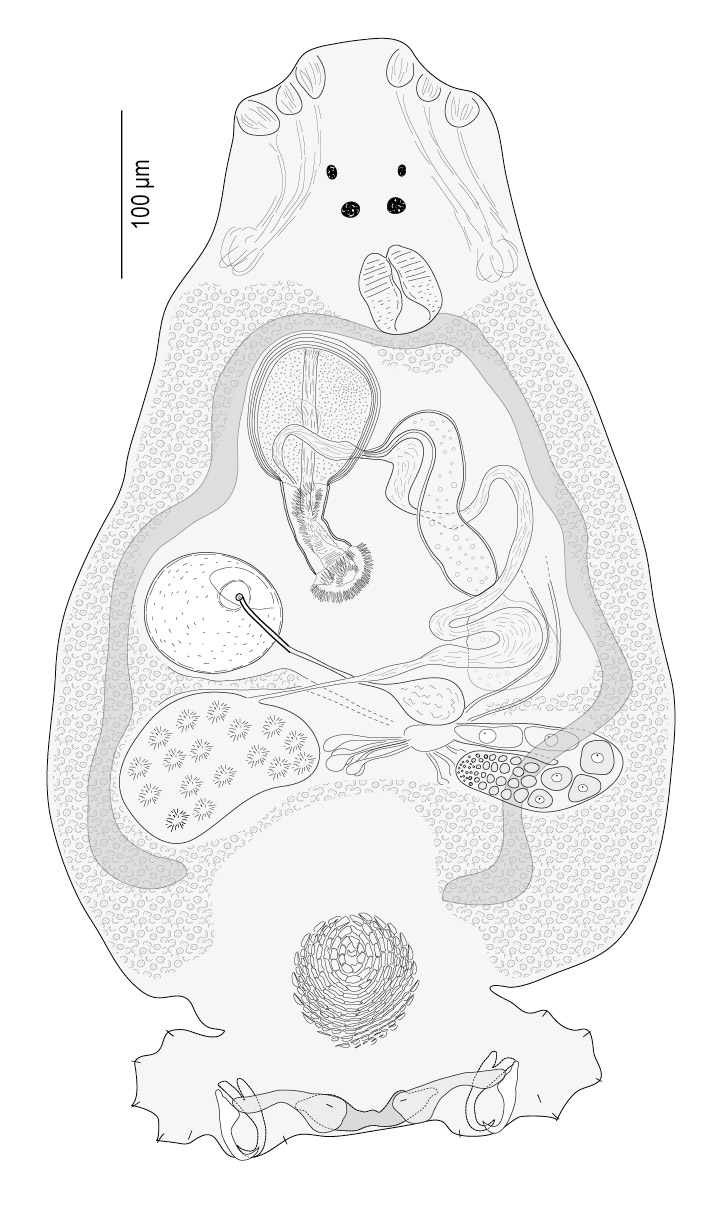
Echinoplectanum laeve

Echinoplectanum is a genus of monopisthocotylean monogeneans in the family Diplectanidae. All its species are parasites on the gills of fish; hosts recorded to date are all groupers (Family Serranidae), including coral groupers (genus Plectropomus) and the Dusky grouper (Epinephelus marginatus). So far, species of Echinoplectanum have been recorded only from fish caught off Australia, New Caledonia and in the Mediterranean Sea.

The type-species of the genus is Echinoplectanum laeve Justine & Euzet, 2006.

== Etymology ==
The generic name is derived from the Ancient Greek plectos, "plaited, twisted", in reference to its squamodiscs, and echinos, "hedgehog", in reference to its cirral spines.

== Species ==
Species include:

- Echinoplectanum chauvetorum Justine & Euzet, 2006
- Echinoplectanum echinophallus (Euzet & Oliver, 1965) Justine & Euzet, 2006
- Echinoplectanum laeve Justine & Euzet, 2006
- Echinoplectanum leopardi Justine & Euzet, 2006
- Echinoplectanum plectropomi (Young, 1969) Justine & Euzet, 2006
- Echinoplectanum pudicum Justine & Euzet, 2006
- Echinoplectanum rarum Justine & Euzet, 2006
