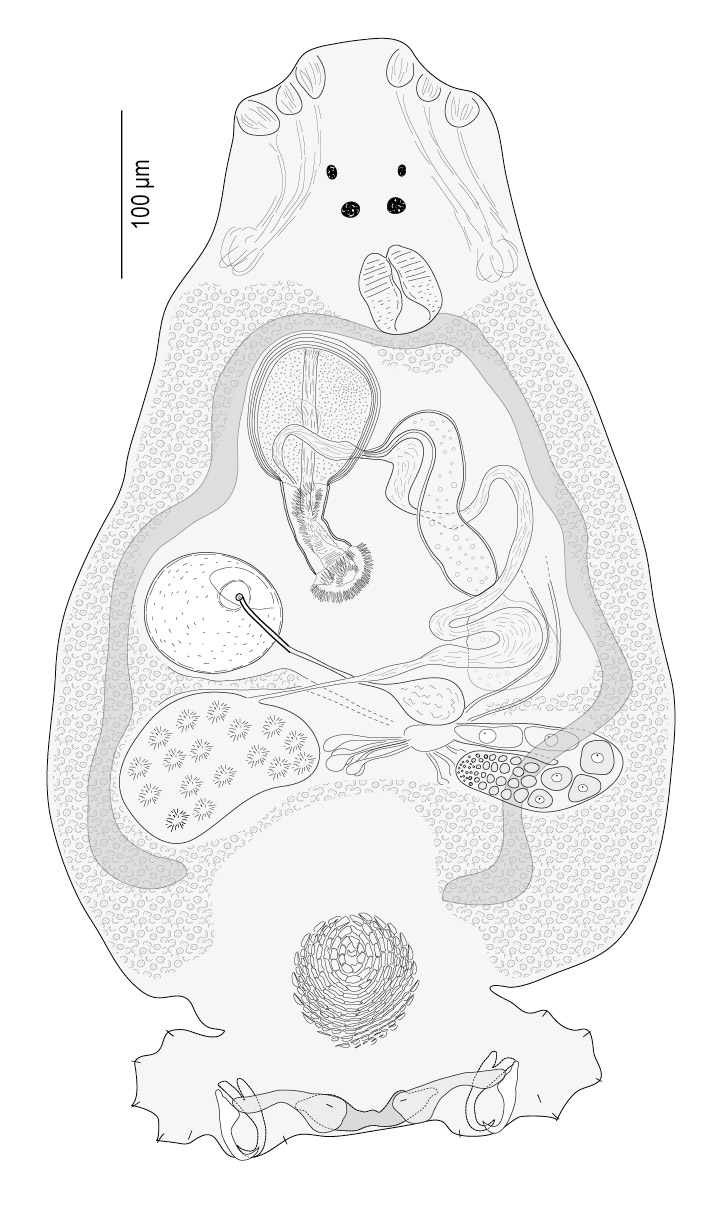

Scientific classification
- Kingdom: Animalia
- Phylum: Platyhelminthes
- Class: Monogenea
- Order: Dactylogyridea
- Family: Diplectanidae
- Genus: Echinoplectanum
- Species: E. laeve

Binomial name
- Echinoplectanum laeve Justine & Euzet, 2006

= Echinoplectanum laeve =

Species of flatworm

Echinoplectanum laeve is a species of diplectanid monogenean parasitic on the gills of the black-saddled coralgrouper, Plectropomus laevis. It has been described in 2006. E. laeve is the type-species of the genus Echinoplectanum.

== Etymology ==
Echinoplectanum laeve was named for the species of its type-host, Plectropomus laevis. Justine & Euzet also indicated that “the epithet laeve (Latin for smooth) was not inappropriate for a diplectanid without tegumental body scales”.

== Hosts and localities ==
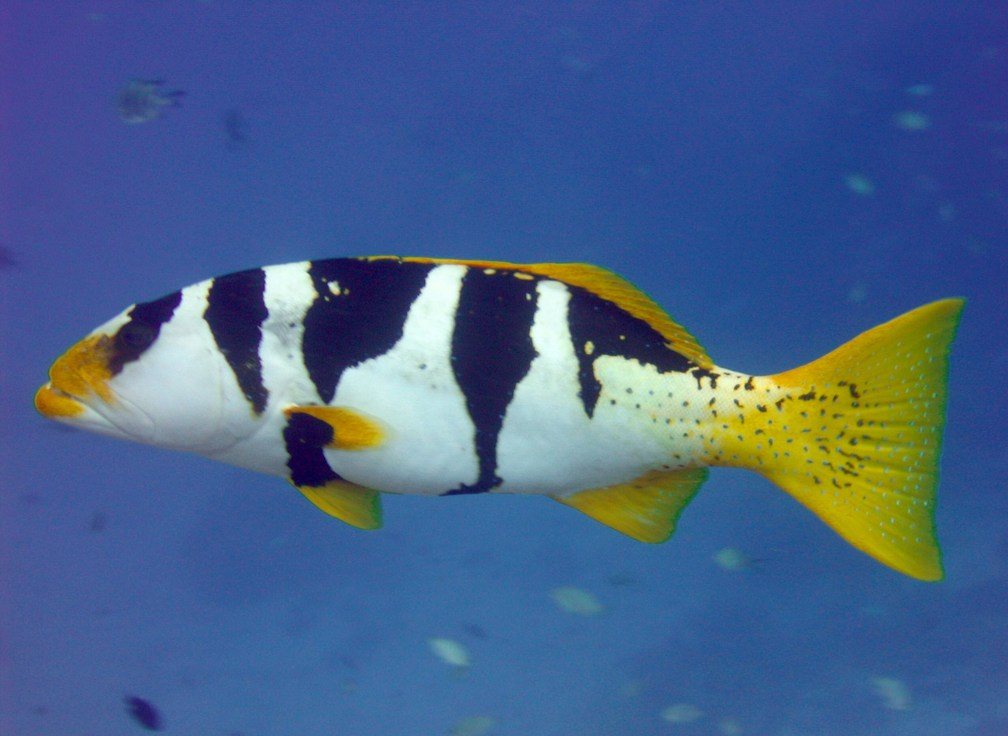
The black-saddled coral grouper Plectropomus laevis is the host of Echinoplectanum laeve

The black-saddled coral grouper Plectropomus laevis is the type-host of Echinoplectanum laeve. The type-locality is the coral reef off Nouméa, New Caledonia.
