= Leopard coral grouper =

Conservation status
- Least Concern (IUCN 3.1)

Scientific classification
- Kingdom: Animalia
- Phylum: Chordata
- Class: Actinopterygii
- Division: Teleostei
- Order: Perciformes
- Suborder: Percoidei
- Family: Epinephelidae
- Genus: Plectropomus
- Species: P. leopardus

Binomial name
- Plectropomus leopardus (Lacépède, 1802)

Synonyms
- List: Holocentrus leopardus Lacépède, 1802; Plectropoma leopardinus Cuvier, 1828; Acanthistius leopardinus (Cuvier, 1828); Plectropoma cyanostigma Bleeker, 1845; Paracanthistius suji Tanaka, 1916

Species of fish

The leopard coral grouper (Plectropomus leopardus), also known as the common coral trout, leopard coral trout, blue-dotted coral grouper or spotted coral grouper, is a species of marine ray-finned fish, a grouper from the family Epinephelidae. It is found in the Western Pacific Ocean.

Coral trout are the favourite target fish for all sectors of the fishery because they are a good food fish and command high market prices locally and overseas. The total commercial catch of coral trout was reported at over 1500 tonnes in 1998.

== Taxonomy ==
The leopard coral grouper was first formally described as Holocentrus leopardus by the French naturalist Bernard Germain de Lacépède ((1756-1825) with the type locality given as the Mer des Indes.

== Distribution ==
The leopard coral grouper is found in the western Pacific where it is distributed from southern Japan to Australia and from the east coast of Thailand and Malaysia east to the Solomon Islands, Caroline Islands and Fiji.

In Australia it is found at Beacon Island in Western Australia, the Ashmore and Cartier Islands in the Timor Sea, around the tropical northcoast as far south as Sydney. This range includes reefs in the Coral Sea, Christmas Island, Cocos (Keeling) Islands and around Lord Howe Island in the Tasman Sea.

== Description ==
Juvenile (left) and adult (right), in Thailand
In Thailand

The leopard coral grouper has a body which is elongate and robust, with the standard length being 2.9 to 3.9 times the depth of the body. The preopercle is mostly rounded, with three large, downward pointing spines along the bottom half. The dorsal fin contains 7–8 spines and 10–12 soft rays while the anal fin contains 3 spines and 8 soft rays. The spiny part of the dorsal fin has a shorter base than the soft-rayed part. The caudal fin is a emarginate.

The background colour is olive green to reddish brown or orange-red and its upper body is covered in regularly-spaced bright blue spots and there is a blue ring around the eye, this may be broken up. They are able to quickly change colour, and frequently take on a mottled pattern as they hunt.

This species attains a total length of 120 centimetres (47 in), although they are commonly around 35 centimetres (14 in), and a maximum published weight of 23.6 kilograms (52 lb). although this is probably incorrect (and likely to be for P. leavis) as the Australian Spearfishing record for P. leopardus is 10.250 kilograms (22.60 lb).

== Habitat and biology ==
In Queensland

The leopard coral grouper is found in coral reefs at depths of 3 to 100 metres (9.8 to 328.1 ft).

In Thailand

=== Reproduction ===
A project called the "Effects of Line Fishing" project studied populations to assess the size and age structures during reproduction of leopard coral grouper stocks to ascertain how fish stocks respond to various levels of fishing pressure. They are protogynous hermaphrodites, starting their lives as females, and change sex later in life. The trigger of this sex change is unknown. On average, sex change occurs when fish are between 23 and 62 cm (9.1 and 24.4 in) in length; the average length at sex change is 42 cm (17 in). This is believed to happen most frequently in the months immediately following spawning. The ELF research has determined that the sex ratio differs in different areas of the Great Barrier Reef, and may differ between reefs opened and protected from fishing. Sex ratios are an important consideration for management, as changes could seriously affect reproduction, thus the number of juveniles coming into the fishery in future years. All length classes of fish may have both male and female individuals. However, small fish are generally females, while most large fish are males.

spawning corresponds to an increase in water temperature (from 25.0 to 26.5 °C or 77.0 to 79.7 °F) during late spring. In the northern Great Barrier Reef, these fish spawn between September and December, whereas in the southern regions where the water is cooler, spawning occurs between October and February. The beginning and end of spawning can vary from year to year as the water temperature varies. Leopard coral groupers generally form into a dense aggregation to spawn. These aggregations are formed around reef slopes around 10 to 15 m (33 to 49 ft) deep and peak at the new moon. Spawning occurs when the tidal flow is strong, particularly during ebb tides. This is thought to allow the newly released eggs to be transported well away from the reef and its associated predators. Spawning typically takes place at dusk, when the light levels make it difficult for predators to see and feed upon the eggs.

As coral trout aggregate, males establish temporary territories. They then try to entice females into their territories to spawn by means of elaborate courtship displays. As part of this courtship ritual, male coral trout display their fins' darkened edges, which can be switched on and off almost instantly. The male approaches a female, which is usually close to the bottom, with his body tilted at 45–90° (almost lying on his side in the water) and repeatedly quivering lengthwise and shaking his head from side to side. He passes close to the female's head or body with either the top or underside of his body. This process is repeated. Spawning rushes occur after this courtship behavior, if the female agrees. During a spawning rush, the male and female swim rapidly towards the surface, where they release sperm and eggs into the water as they quickly turn. The cloud of sperm and eggs released during a spawning rush is not easily seen, but its presence can sometimes be noted by the frantic feeding of small zooplankton-eating fish. The spawning of coral trout generally occurs over a 30-40 minute period during sunset. Some coral trout (especially males) spawn more than once during an evening.

=== Life cycle ===
Like most reef fish, coral trout have a larval stage where the eggs and larvae develop within the water column, allowing them to disperse to nearby reefs. Fertilisation takes place after spawning; the fertilised eggs float just below the water surface. The incubation period for coral trout eggs is unknown, but may be around 20 to 45 hours (the incubation period in related species). The newly hatched larvae are not very well developed and obtain nutrients from a yolk sac. As they develop, their spines, fins, gut, and other internal organs develop, as do their senses. Eventually, the yolk sac is completely absorbed and the larvae begin to see and catch their own prey.

The fastest period of growth in coral trout occurs in the first three years of life. The average daily growth of newly settled juveniles has been measured at 0.81 mm per day. This means they reach close to 14 cm (5.5 in) in the first 6 months. Growth rates of coral trout are variable; every age class has a wide range of sizes. To estimate growth, the age and size of a fish must be determined. Most commonly, the growth of fish is measured by collecting individuals of varying sizes, measuring their length, and determining their age by the otoliths. Recent research at Bramble Reef has found that common coral trout (P. leopardus) reaches a maximum age of 16 years.

=== Diet ===
Leopeard coral groupers are largely piscivores (fish-eating predators). Younger juvenile trout mostly eat crustaceans, especially prawns, which live on or near the reef bottom. However, adults feed upon a variety of reef fish. The most common type of fish eaten is damselfish (family Pomacentridae), particularly the spiny chromis damselfish (Acanthochromis polyacanthus). Adult coral trout also eat juveniles of their own species. Individual coral trout usually feed once every 1–3 days, although they may go for many days without feeding. About 90% of a prey item will be digested within 24 hours. This species only feeds during daylight hours, most often at dusk and dawn. Coral trout hunt by ambush and by prowling. They use the ambush method to hunt fish that live among the coral on the reef bottom. The trout hide and remain very still and alert, ready to attack passing prey. The prowling method is used to hunt schooling fish higher up in the water. Here, the trout will move (prowl) slowly towards the prey and attack at great speed. Individual coral trout have different feeding behaviors, possibly explaining the variability in growth and maturity.

Coral trout in the southern Great Barrier Reef feed mainly on parrot fish (family Scaridae) and hardyhead bait fish (family Atherinidae). The most common prey items further north are the damselfish (Pomacentridae) and fusiliers or banana fish (Caesionidae). One study showed coral trout eating schools of fusilers in summer, and scarids during the winter. This seasonal variation is quite common in the diet of coral trout due to varying abundances of prey at different times of the year. Trout also tend to eat more food in winter, possibly to increase fat stores in preparation for reproduction in spring. They sometimes engage in cooperative hunting with the giant moray (Gymnothorax javanicus), the humphead wrasse (Cheilinus undulatus), or the big blue octopus (Octopus cyanea).

=== Parasites ===
As most fish, this species harbours many parasite species. The diplectanid monogenean Echinoplectanum leopardi, named after the fish, is a parasite on the gills, as well as its congeners Echinoplectanum rarum and Echinoplectanum pudicum.

== Utilisation ==
Live P. leopardus for sale, in Yunnan

The leopard coral grouper is highly-valued as a food fish and is sold in both the live and chilled reef fish food trade, centred on Hong Kong. The catching of live fish for export is an important commercial fishery in the Asia-Pacific region, currently they are primarily sourced from Indonesia and the Philippines. In Australia it is caught by commercial fisheries using hook and line and is taken by recreational fishers using handlines, rods and spearguns. Average Catch Per Unit Effort of 0.59-0.68 species/day and weight of 1.58 and 1.60kg for leopard coral grouper captured by spearfishers in Australia.

It is fished for using cyanide in the Philippines and Indonesia. In Fiji and New Caledonia artisanal fishers catch it using hook and line and spear, and as bycatch in traps. Large specimens can have very high levels of ciguatoxin in their flesh. Fish have been raised in mariculture in Asia but cultured fish are often not the more desirable red colour.
