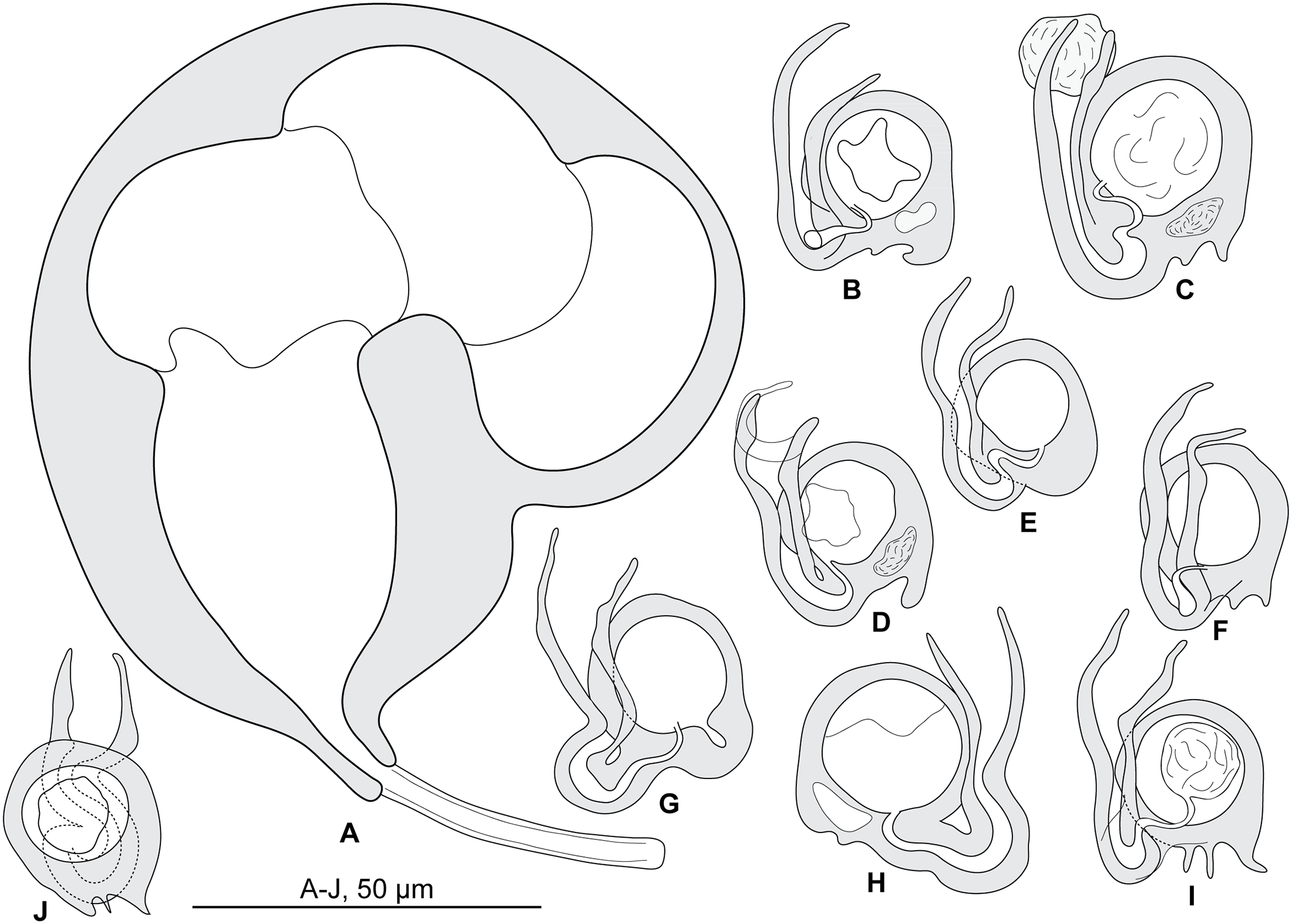
- Pseudorhabdosynochus enitsuji: male and female sclerotised organs

Scientific classification
- Kingdom: Animalia
- Phylum: Platyhelminthes
- Class: Monogenea
- Order: Dactylogyridea
- Family: Diplectanidae
- Genus: Pseudorhabdosynochus
- Species: P. enitsuji

Binomial name
- Pseudorhabdosynochus enitsuji Neifar & Euzet, 2007

= Pseudorhabdosynochus enitsuji =

Species of flatworm

Pseudorhabdosynochus enitsuji is a diplectanid monogenean parasitic on the gills of groupers. It has been described in 2007 by Lassad Neifar & Louis Euzet. The name of the species honours French parasitologist Jean-Lou Justine (enitsuji is an anagram of Justine). The species has been redescribed by Amira Chaabane, Lassad Neifar, and Jean-Lou Justine in 2017, from the type-material and additional specimens.

== Description ==
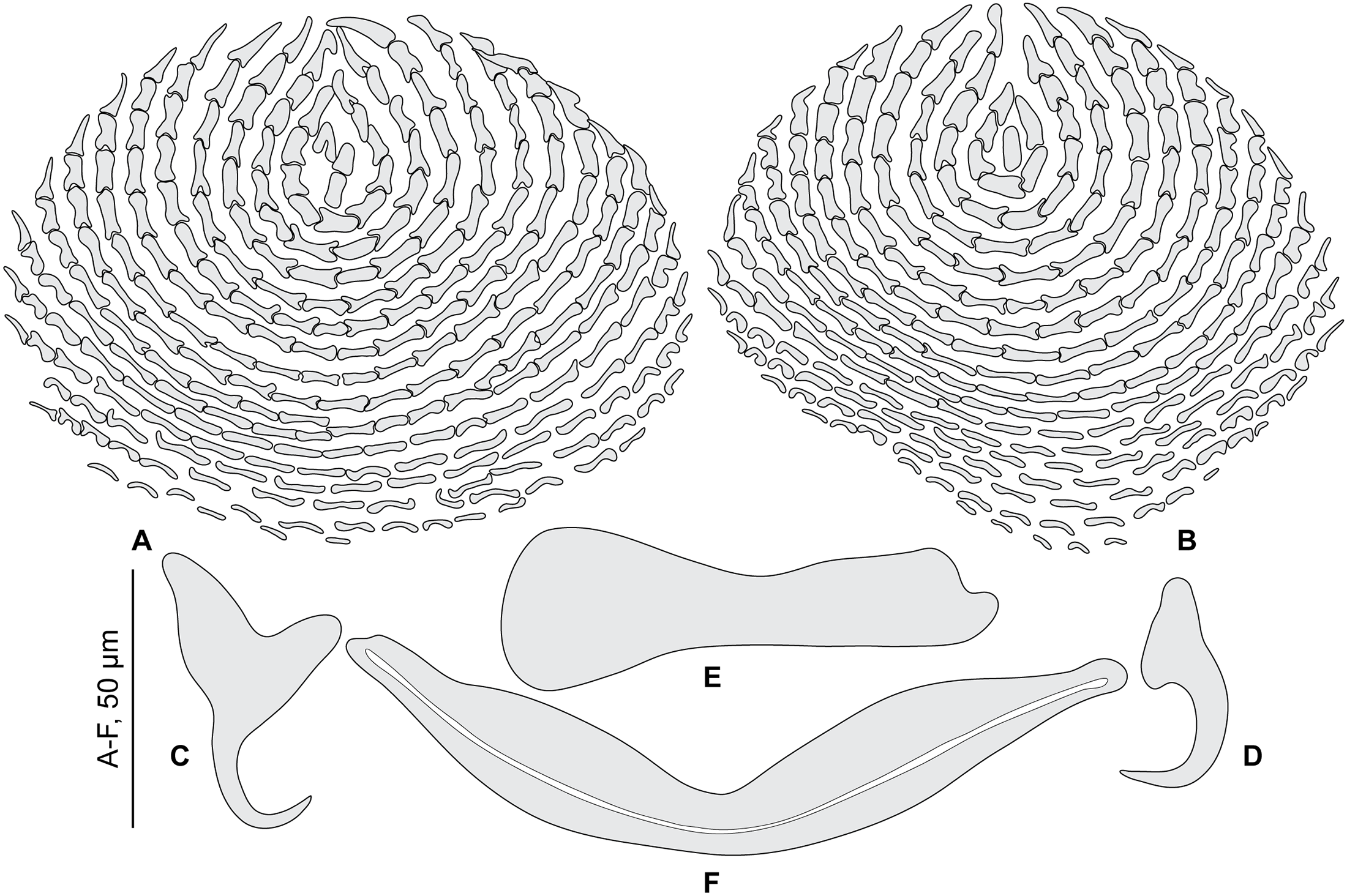
Pseudorhabdosynochus enitsuji, squamodiscs and haptoral parts

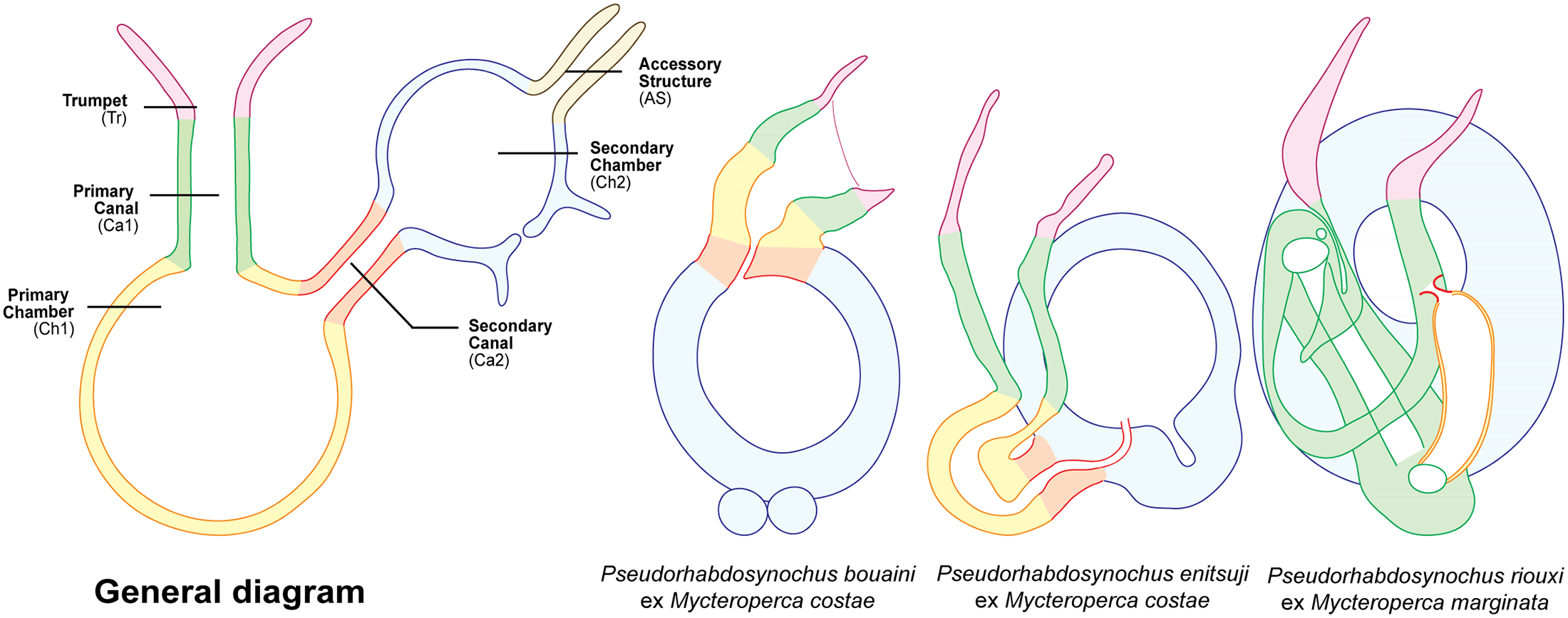
Homologies of the sclerotized vaginae in species of the 'Pseudorhabdosynochus riouxi group'

Pseudorhabdosynochus enitsuji is a small monogenean. The species has the general characteristics of other species of Pseudorhabdosynochus, with a flat body and a posterior haptor, which is the organ by which the monogenean attaches itself to the gill of is host. The haptor bears two squamodiscs, one ventral and one dorsal.

The sclerotized male copulatory organ, or "quadriloculate organ", has the shape of a bean with four internal chambers, as in other species of Pseudorhabdosynochus. The vagina includes a sclerotized part, which is a complex structure.

Chaabane, Neifar, and Justine, in 2017 considered that the three species Pseudorhabdosynochus riouxi, Pseudorhabdosynochus bouaini, and Pseudorhabdosynochus enitsuji shared a common general structure of the sclerotized vagina with a conspicuous spherical secondary chamber and proposed to accommodate them within a 'Pseudorhabdosynochus riouxi group'. These three species are also parasites on groupers classified within the genus Mycteroperca.

== Hosts and localities ==
The goldblotch grouper Mycteroperca costae is the type-host of Pseudorhabdosynochus enitsuji. The type-locality is the Mediterranean Sea off Tunisia; Off Libya and the Atlantic Ocean off Dakar, Senegal are additional localities.
