= Jean-Lou Justine =

French parasitologist and zoologist

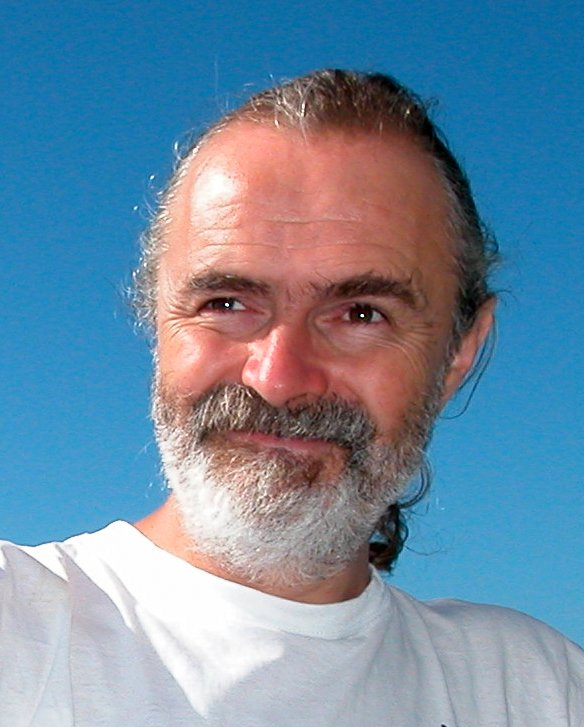
- Jean-Lou Justine, 2004
- Born: 1955 (age 70–71); Saint Quentin, France
- Citizenship: French
- Education: University of Nice Sophia Antipolis, University of Montpellier
- Known for: Monogenea, Fish parasites,
- Scientific career
- Fields: parasitology, zoology
- Workplaces: National Museum of Natural History (France), Paris
- Doctoral advisors: Louis Euzet, Xavier Mattei
- Other academic advisors: Claude Combes, Alain Chabaud
- Author abbrev. (zoology): Justine
- Website: link,

Jean-Lou Justine (born 1955), French parasitologist and zoologist, is a professor at the National Museum of Natural History in Paris, France, and a specialist of fish parasites and invasive land planarians.

== Higher education and career ==
Justine was in high school in Saint Raphaël, France, then an undergraduate student at the University of Nice (1972–1976), and at the École Normale Supérieure in Saint-Cloud after which he passed the Agrégation in 1977, and finally a graduate student at the University of Montpellier. He passed his PhD in 1980 and his Doctorat d'État (State doctorate) in 1985, both in the University of Montpellier, under the supervision of Professors Xavier Mattei and Louis Euzet.

From 1978 to 1985, Justine was Assistant then Maître-Assistant (assistant professor) at the University of Dakar, Senegal. He entered the National Museum of Natural History (MNHN) in 1985 to join, as Maître-Assistant (Assistant Professor) the laboratory directed at that time by Professor Alain Chabaud. He is a member of the MNHN since, and a full professor since 1995, but spent several years (2003–2011) as visiting scholar in Nouméa, New Caledonia.

Justine is the curator of the parasitic worms in the National Museum of Natural History in Paris, France, and, since 2013, a deputy-director the Institute of Systematics, Evolution and Biodiversity (ISYEB), one of the largest units in the MNHN.

He is also a member of the EASIN (European Alien Species Information Network) Editorial Board since 2015 and the editor-in-chief of the journal Parasite since 2012.

== Research ==
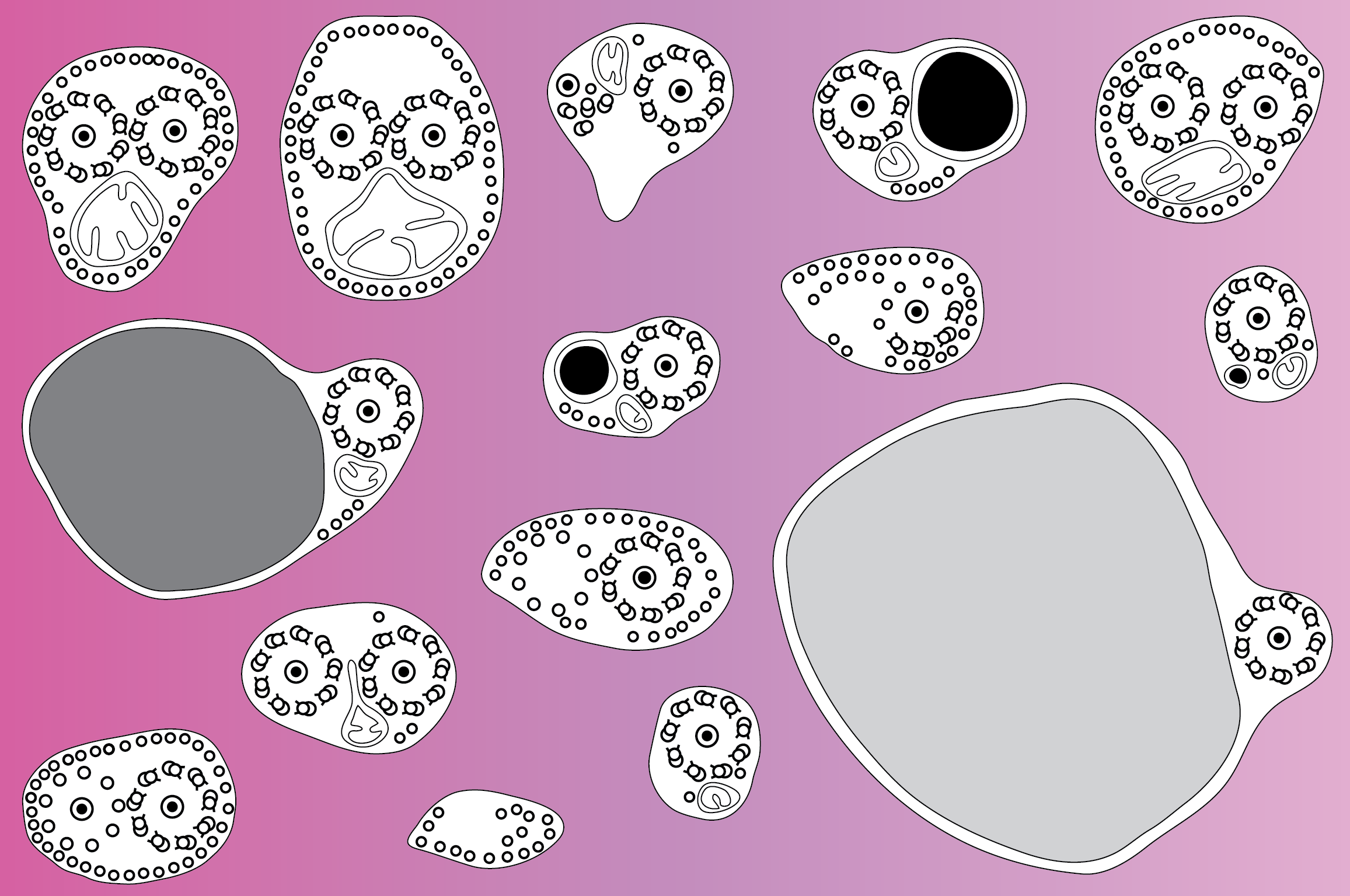
Drawings of spermatozoa from a paper authored by Justine

Justine has worked on several fields during his career. His early research and his theses were about sperm ultrastructure in parasitic flatworms and its use for phylogeny. He then worked on systematics of nematodes, monogeneans and other parasites, especially the species from coral reef fish.

Justine has published more than 250 papers since 1981 and described more than one hundred new species, which are all parasitic animals belonging mainly to the Nematoda and Monogenea, and also Digenea, Cestoda, and Crustacea.

After 2013, Justine undertook a research about invasive land planarians, such as Platydemus manokwari. The papers issued from this research had some impact on the media, including French radios, televisions and newspapers, and newspapers and media from the USA, UK and other countries.

== Editing activities ==
Justine has been the editor-in-chief of the Mémoires du Muséum National d'Histoire Naturelle, from 1992 to 1998, and of Zoosystema, a journal of zoology, from 1998 to 2002; both are journals published by the National Museum of Natural History in Paris. Since 2013, he is the editor-in-chief of the open-access journal Parasite, the official journal of the French Society of Parasitology. Justine is a member of the editorial board of the parasitological journals Helminthologia, Acta Parasitologica, and Folia Parasitologica, and is one of the numerous Academic Editors of the megajournal PeerJ. Justine has also been the editor of a few books, on spermatozoa, ultrastructure of flatworms and deep-sea fauna and of an International Congress Proceeding on flatworms.

== Eponymous taxa ==
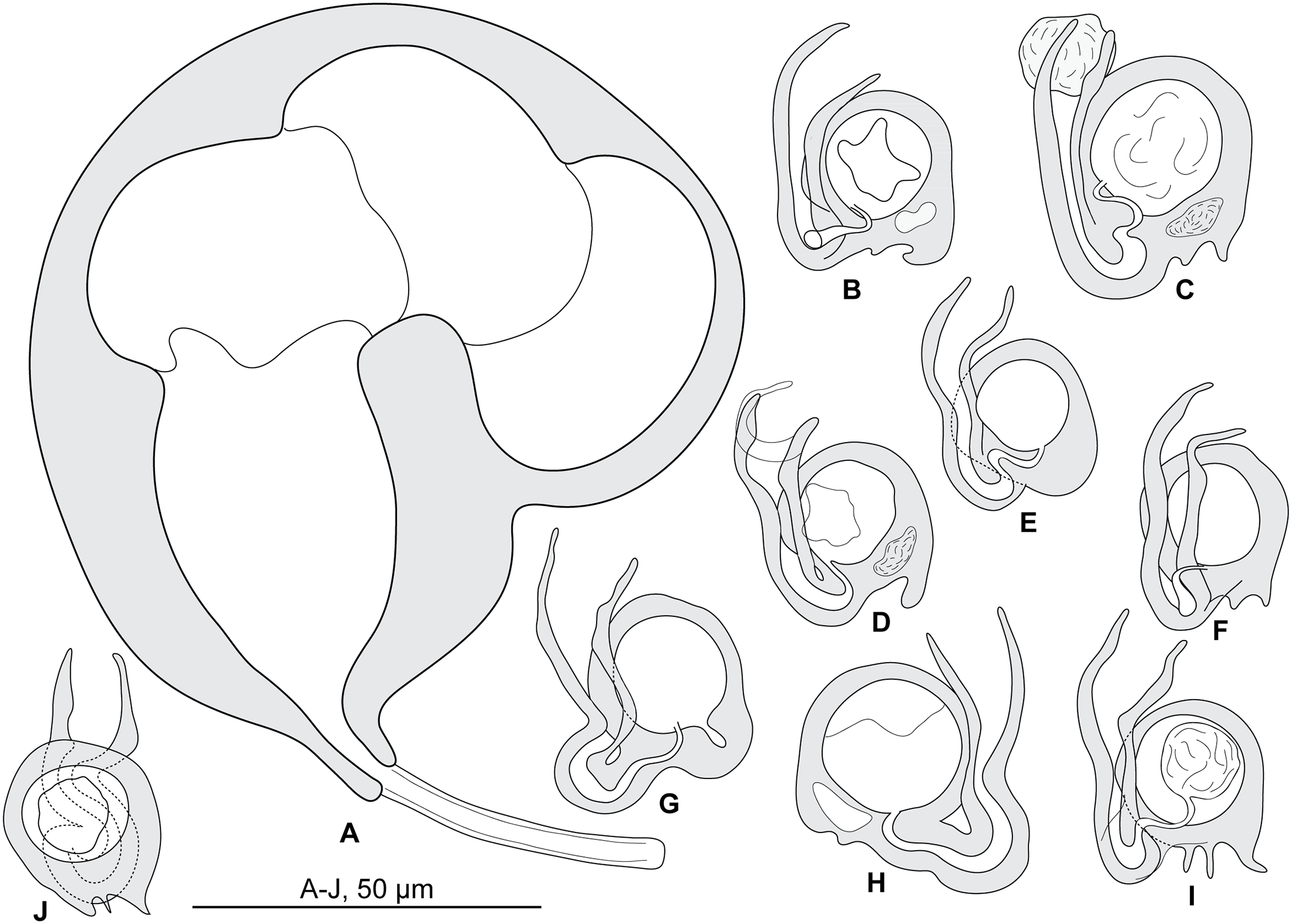
Pseudorhabdosynochus enitsuji, male and female organs

A small number of taxa names have been created to honour his name – most are parasitic worms. The genus Justinema R'kha & Durette-Desset, 1991, is a member of the trichostrongylid nematodes. Species named after him include nematodes such as Philometra justinei Moravec, Ternengo & Levron, 2006 and Ascarophis justinei Moravec, Dykman & Davis, 2023, digeneans such as Hurleytrematoides justinei McNamara & Cribb, 2009 and Lepotrema justinei Bray, Cutmore & Cribb, 2018, and a parasitic copepod, Anuretes justinei Venmathi Maran, Ohtsuka & Boxshall, 2008. Among the Monogenea, Cichlidogyrus jeanloujustinei Rahmouni, Vanhove & Šimková, 2017 has been named after him, as well as Microcotyle justinei Ayadi & Tazerouti, 2023, Plectanocotyle jeanloujustinei Cappelletti & Bouguerche, 2024, and four species of the genus Pseudorhabdosynochus, namely Pseudorhabdosynochus justinei Zeng & Yang, 2007, P. enitsuji Neifar & Euzet, 2007 (an anagram of justinei), P. jeanloui Knoff, Cohen, Cárdenas, Cárdenas-Callirgos & Gomes, 2015, and P. justinella Kritsky, Bakenhaster & Adams, 2015. Solenofilomorpha justinei Nilsson, Wallberg & Jondelius 2011, an Acoela, is not a parasite.
