= Holorchis =

Scientific classification
- Kingdom: Animalia
- Phylum: Platyhelminthes
- Class: Trematoda
- Order: Plagiorchiida
- Family: Aephnidiogenidae
- Genus: Holorchis; Stossich, 1901

Genus of flukes

Holorchis is a genus of trematodes in the family Aephnidiogenidae.

== Species ==
- Holorchis castex Bray & Justine, 2007
- Holorchis gigas Bray & Cribb, 2007
- Holorchis legendrei Dollfus, 1946
- Holorchis micracanthum (Stossich, 1889) Orecchia & Paggi, 1974
- Holorchis plectorhynchi Durio & Manter, 1968
- Holorchis pycnoporus Stossich, 1901
