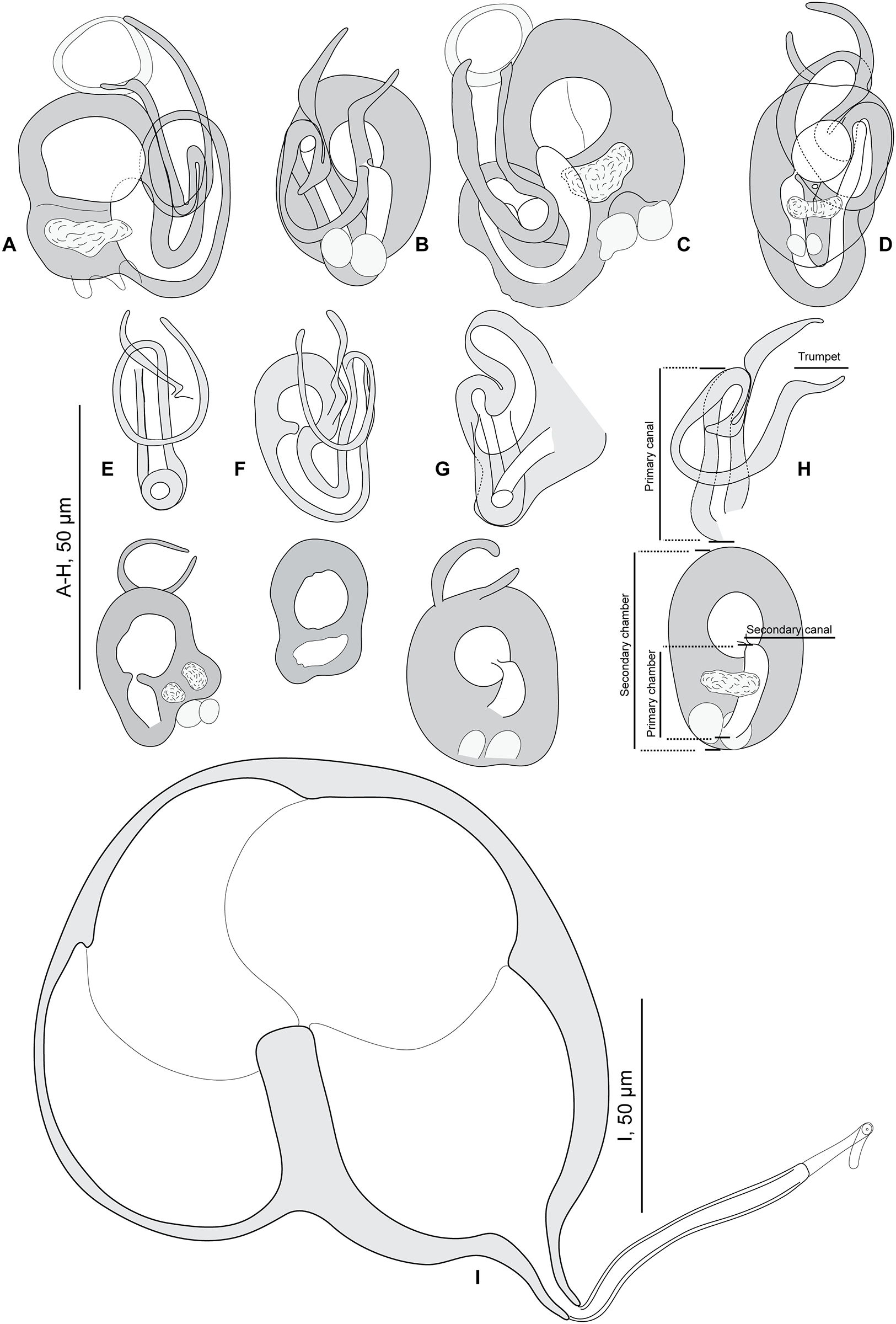
- Sclerotised genital parts

Scientific classification
- Kingdom: Animalia
- Phylum: Platyhelminthes
- Class: Monogenea
- Order: Dactylogyridea
- Family: Diplectanidae
- Genus: Pseudorhabdosynochus
- Species: P. riouxi

Binomial name
- Pseudorhabdosynochus riouxi (Oliver, 1986)

= Pseudorhabdosynochus riouxi =

Species of worm

Pseudorhabdosynochus riouxi is a species of diplectanid monogenean parasitic on the gills of dusky grouper Mycteroperca marginata. It was described by Guy Oliver in 1986 as Cycloplectanum riouxi, then transferred to the genus Pseudorhabdosynochus by Santos, Buchmann & Gibson in 2000. The species has been redescribed by Chaabane et al. in 2017.

== Description ==
Pseudorhabdosynochus riouxi is a small monogenean, 0.3 mm in length. The species has the general characteristics of other species of Pseudorhabdosynochus, with a flat body and a posterior haptor, which is the organ by which the monogenean attaches itself to the gill of is host. The haptor bears two squamodiscs, one ventral and one dorsal. The sclerotized male copulatory organ, or "quadriloculate organ", has the shape of a bean with four internal chambers, as in other species of Pseudorhabdosynochus.

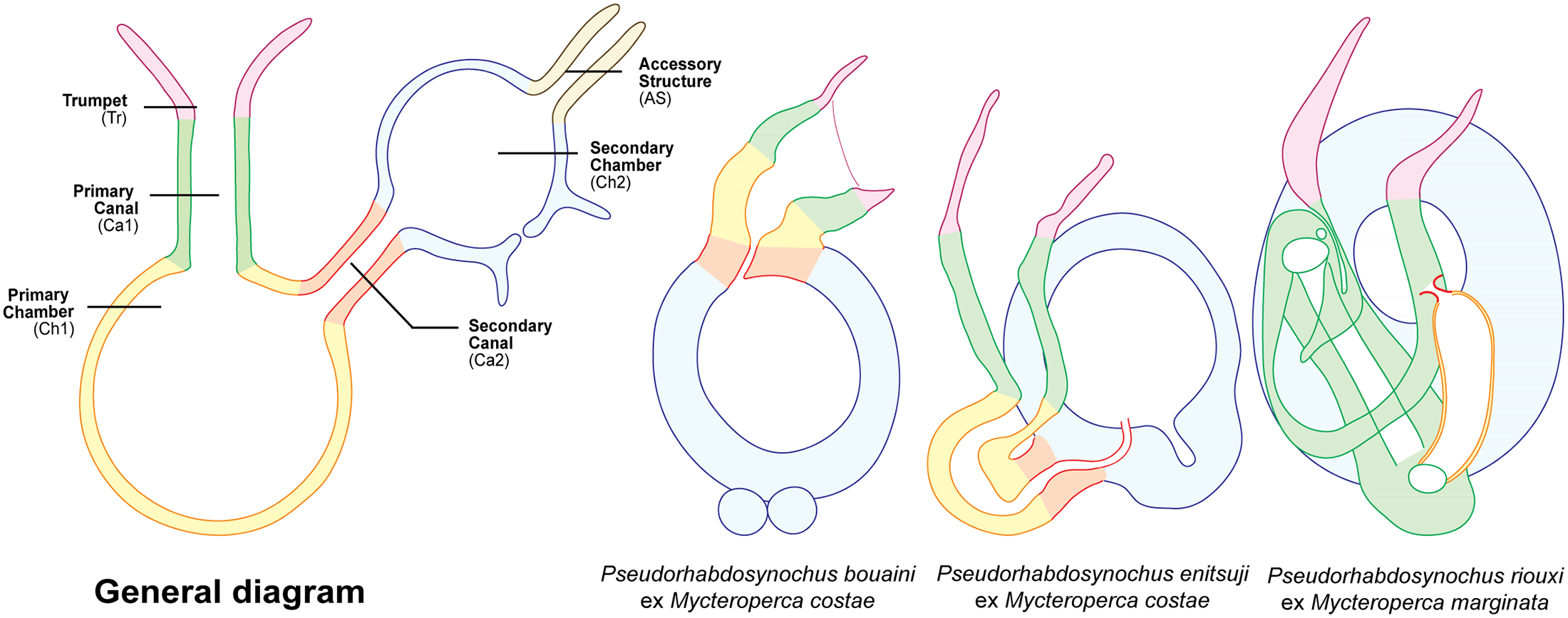
Homologies of the sclerotized vaginae in species of the Pseudorhabdosynochus riouxi group

The vagina includes a sclerotized part, which is a complex structure. Chaabane, Neifar, and Justine, in 2017 considered that the three species Pseudorhabdosynochus riouxi, Pseudorhabdosynochus bouaini, and Pseudorhabdosynochus enitsuji shared a common general structure of the sclerotized vagina with a conspicuous spherical secondary chamber and proposed to accommodate them within a 'Pseudorhabdosynochus riouxi group'.

== Etymology ==
The name of the species, riouxi, honours Professor Jean-Antoine Rioux, "as President of the Société Française de Parasitologie".

== Hosts and localities ==
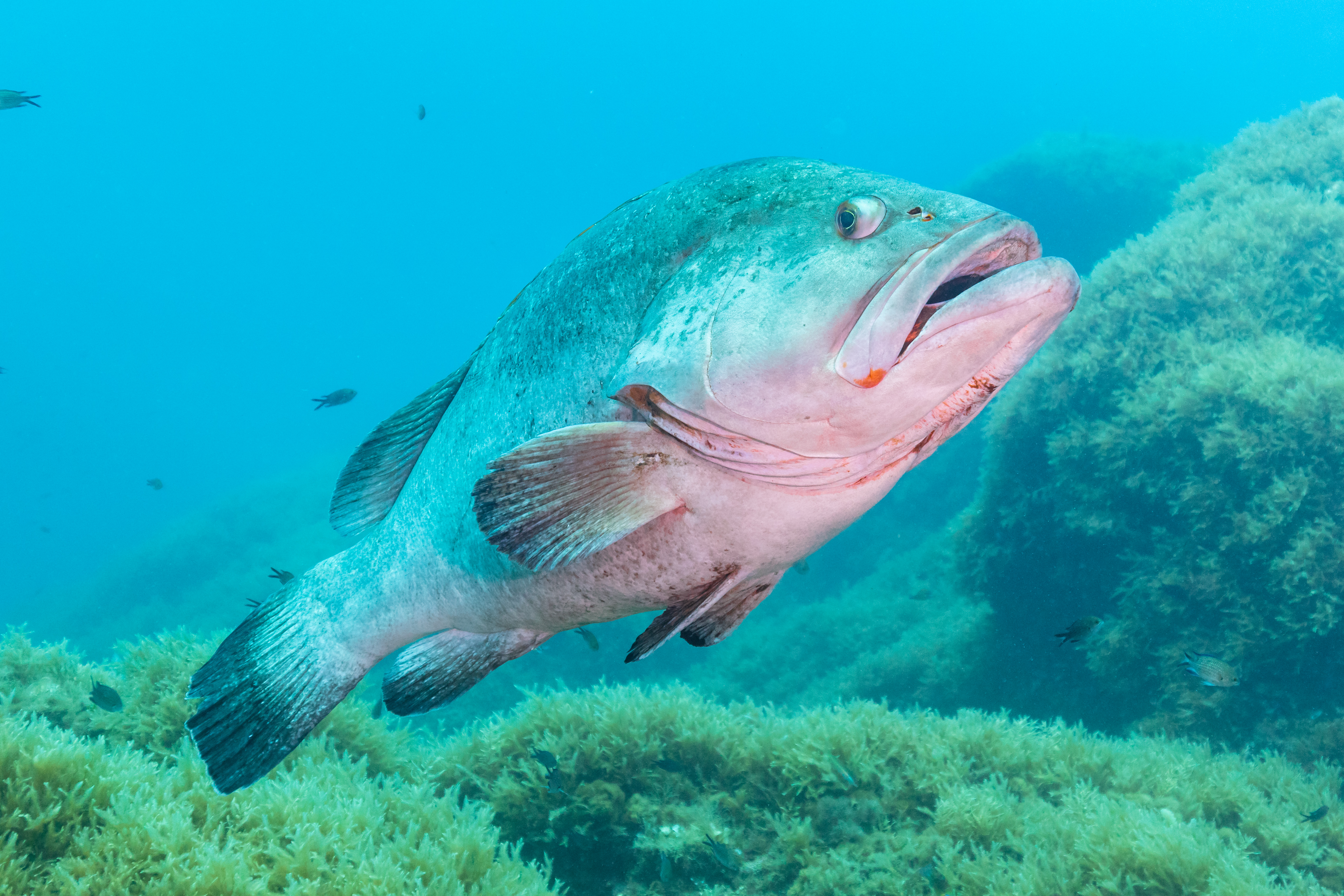
The dusky grouper is the host of Pseudorhabdosynochus riouxi

The type-host is the dusky grouper Mycteroperca marginata (Perciformes, Epinephelidae) sometimes designated by its synonyms in parasitological publications (Epinephelus guaza or Epinephelus marginatus). The type-locality is Off Cap Béar (Mediterranean Sea), France. Other localities have been mentioned.
