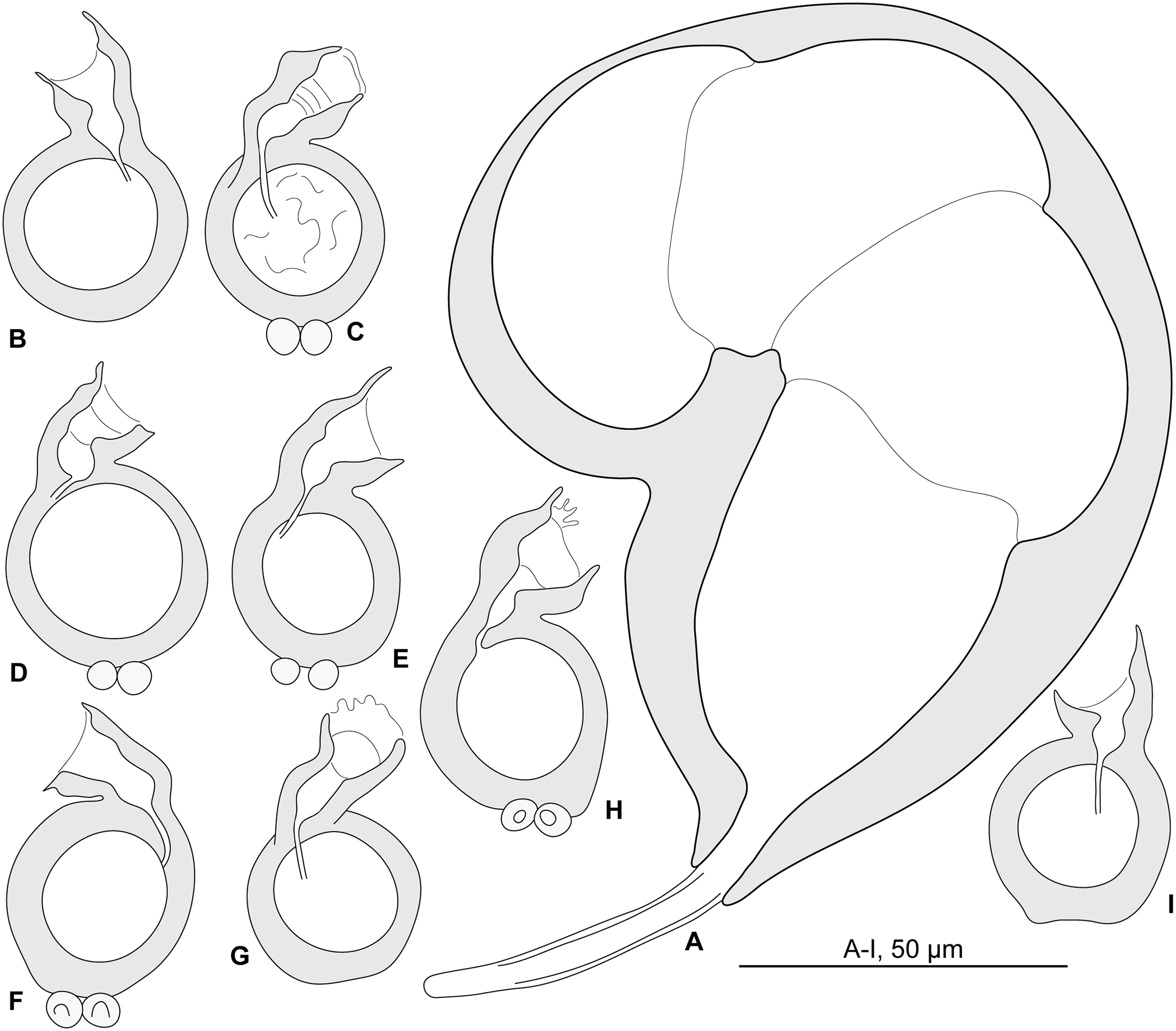
- Pseudorhabdosynochus bouaini: male and female sclerotised organs

Scientific classification
- Kingdom: Animalia
- Phylum: Platyhelminthes
- Class: Monogenea
- Order: Dactylogyridea
- Family: Diplectanidae
- Genus: Pseudorhabdosynochus
- Species: P. bouaini

Binomial name
- Pseudorhabdosynochus bouaini Neifar & Euzet, 2007

= Pseudorhabdosynochus bouaini =

Species of flatworm

Pseudorhabdosynochus bouaini is a diplectanid monogenean parasitic on the gills of groupers. It has been described in 2007 by Lassad Neifar & Louis Euzet. The species has been redescribed by Amira Chaabane, Lassad Neifar, and Jean-Lou Justine in 2017.

== Etymology ==
The specific epithet was given in honor of Professor A. Bouain from the University of Sfax, a specialist in grouper biology.

== Description ==
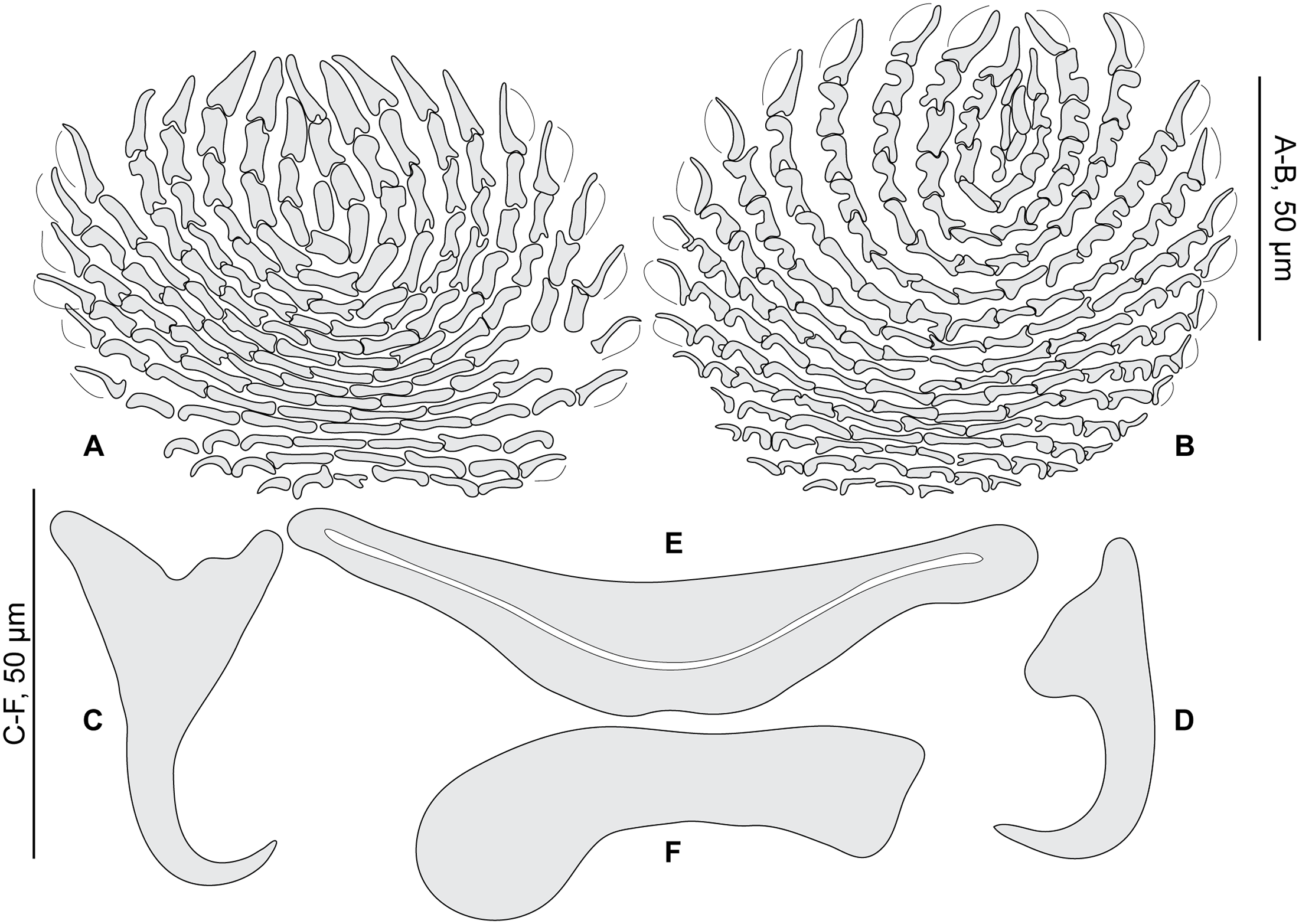
Pseudorhabdosynochus bouaini, squamodiscs and haptoral parts

Pseudorhabdosynochus bouaini is a small monogenean. The species has the general characteristics of other species of Pseudorhabdosynochus, with a flat body and a posterior haptor, which is the organ by which the monogenean attaches itself to the gill of is host. The haptor bears two squamodiscs, one ventral and one dorsal. The sclerotized male copulatory organ, or "quadriloculate organ", has the shape of a bean with four internal chambers, as in other species of Pseudorhabdosynochus. The vagina includes a sclerotized part, which is a complex structure.

Chaabane, Neifar, and Justine, in 2017 considered that the three species Pseudorhabdosynochus riouxi, Pseudorhabdosynochus bouaini, and Pseudorhabdosynochus enitsuji shared a common general structure of the sclerotized vagina with a conspicuous spherical secondary chamber and proposed to accommodate them within a 'Pseudorhabdosynochus riouxi group'.

== Hosts and localities ==
The Goldblotch grouper Mycteroperca costae is the type-host of Pseudorhabdosynochus bouaini. The type-locality is the Mediterranean Sea off Tunisia.
