= Jean-Antoine Rioux =

French parasitologist

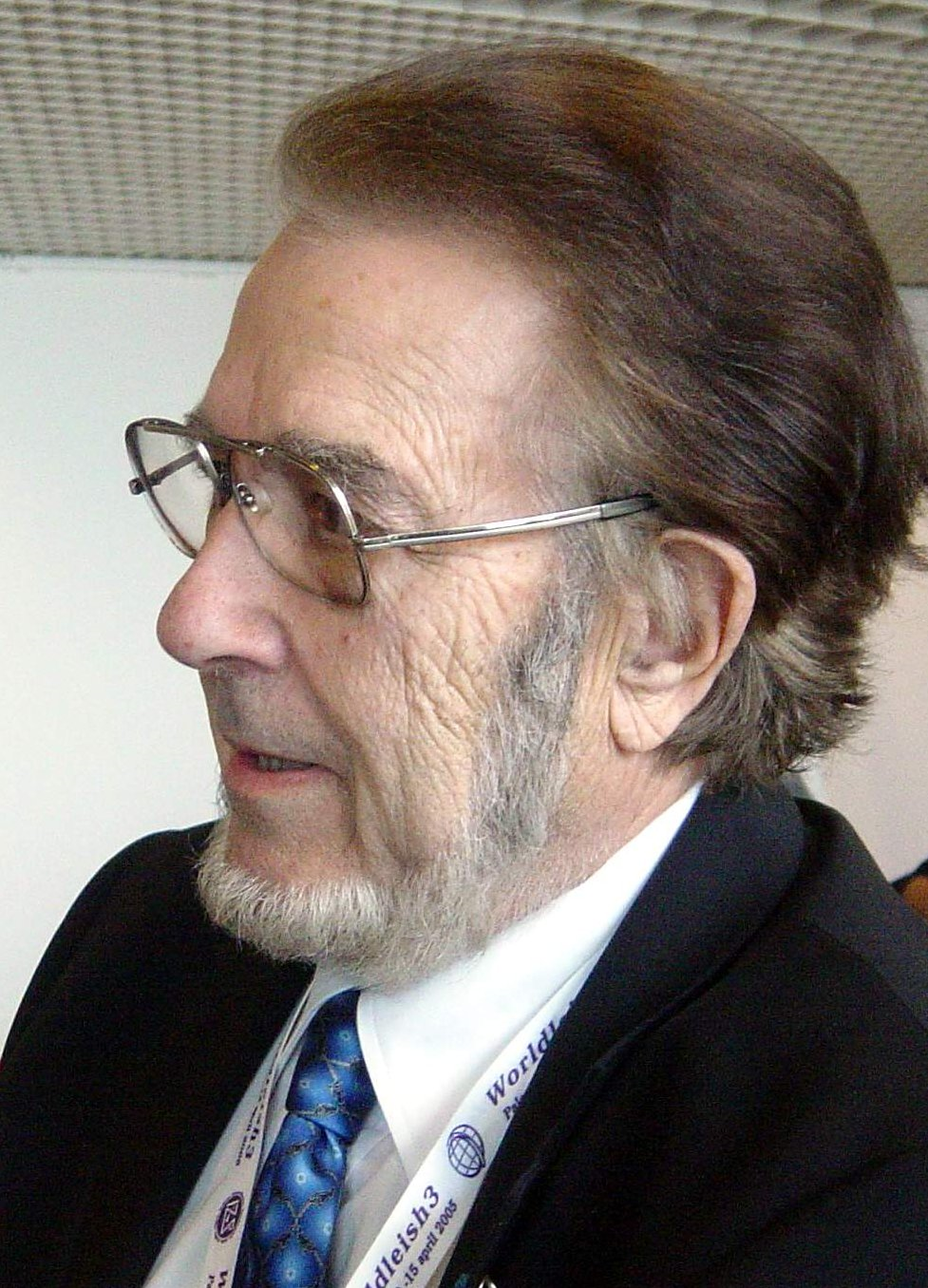
- Jean-Antoine Rioux
- Born: 1925; Naucelle, France
- Died: 2017 (aged 91–92); France
- Education: University of Montpellier
- Scientific career
- Fields: Parasitology, Entomology
- Workplaces: University of Montpellier

Jean-Antoine Rioux (1925–2017) was a French parasitologist, mainly a specialist of leishmaniasis. He coined the term ecoepidemiology for a discipline combining concepts of ecology and epidemiology to understand parasite transmission patterns and processes. He was a professor at the University of Montpellier and one of the founders of the Société Française de Parasitologie in 1962.

== Scientific career ==
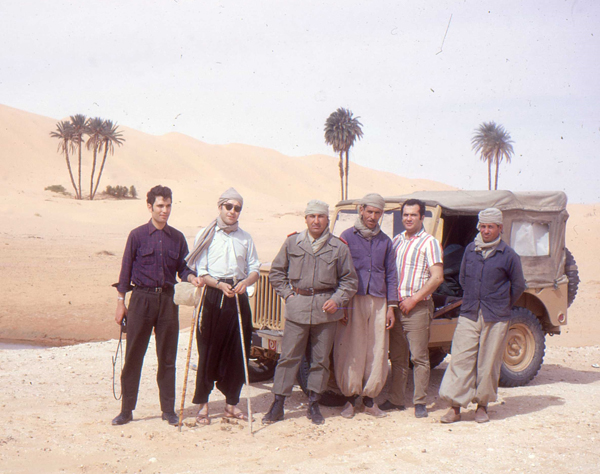
Professor Jean-Antoine Rioux in the field in Tunisia in 1970

Jean-Antoine Rioux worked on several parasitological diseases, including malaria, plague, schistosomiasis, and leishmaniasis. He led teams in the field in France (Camargue, Languedoc, Roussillon, Cévennes, Corsica) and various countries including Iran, Chad, Tunisia, and Morocco.

Jean-Antoine Rioux was also a botanist and the Director of the jardin des plantes de Montpellier, a historic botanical garden and arboretum located in Montpellier, France.

== Taxa named in his honour ==
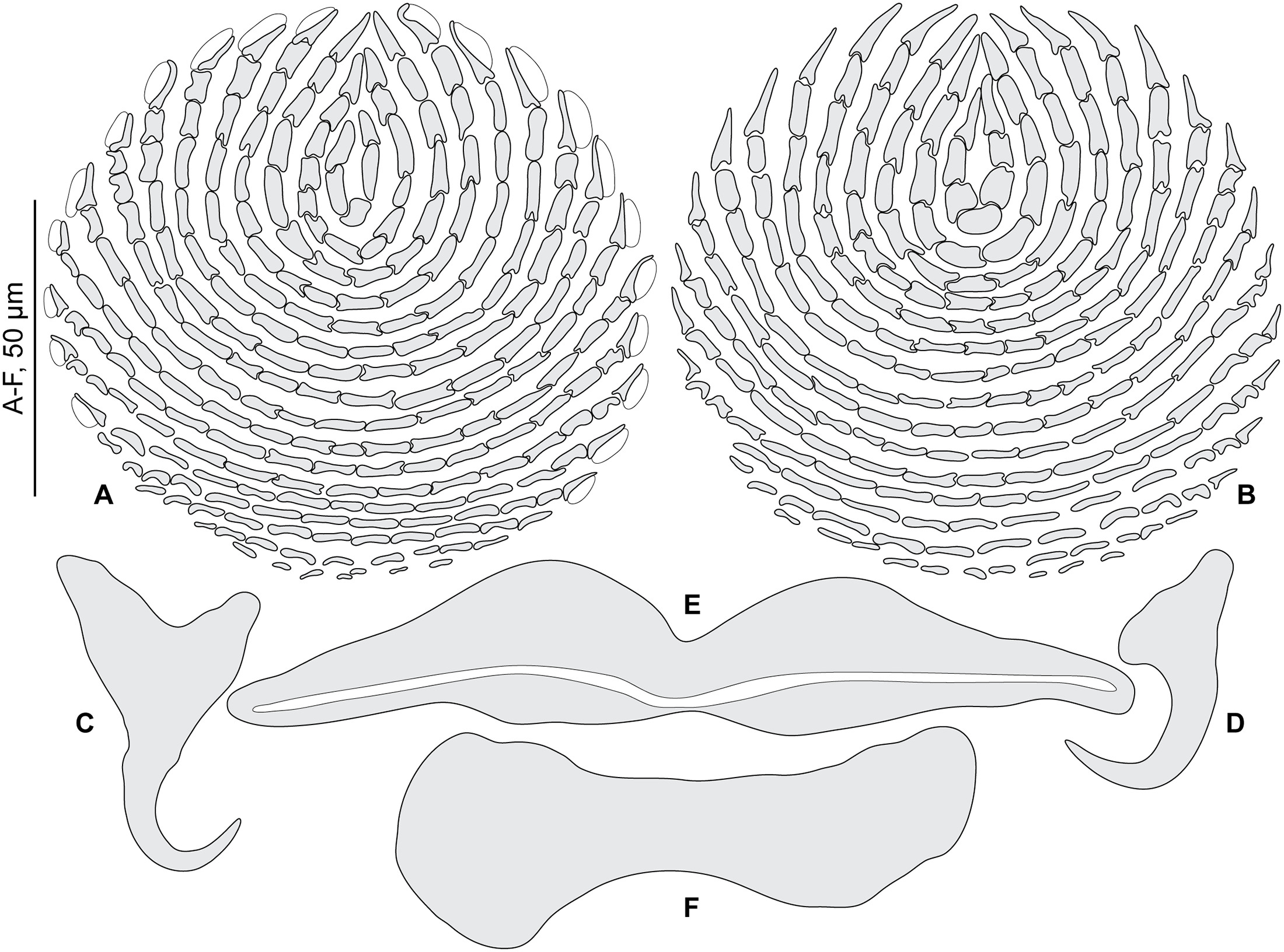
Pseudorhabdosynochus riouxi, a Monogenean named in the honour of Jean-Antoine Rioux

Many taxa were named in the honour of Jean-Antoine Rioux by his colleagues. The list of species includes: Adelina riouxi Levine, 1977 (Coccidia, Adeleidae), Amphinomia riouxii Quézel, 1959 (Rosales, Leguminosae), Culicoides riouxi Callot & Krémer, 1961 (Diptera, Ceratopogonidae), Empidomermis riouxi Doucet, Laumont & Bain, 1979 (Nematoda, Mermithidae), Hystrichopsylla talpae riouxi Beaucournu & Rosin, 1977 (Siphonaptera, Hystrichopsyllidae), Longicollum riouxi Golvan, 1969 (Acanthocephala, Pomphorhynchidae), Phlebotomus (Paraphlebotomus) riouxi Depaquit, Léger & Killick-Kendrick, 1998 (Diptera, Psychodidae), Pseudorhabdosynochus riouxi (Oliver, 1986) Kritsky & Beverley-Burton, 1986 (Monogenea, Diplectanidae). The genus Riouxgolvania Bain & Brunhes, 1968 (Nematoda, Muspiceidae) honours both Jean-Antoine Rioux and Yves-Jean Golvan, two French parasitologists. The subgenus Riouxomyia Depaquit, Blavier & Randrianambinintsoa, 2019 has been created for sandflies (Diptera, Phlebotominae).

== Scientific collection ==
Jean-Antoine Rioux collected un impressive number of specimens, mainly phlebotomes, during his career. His collection includes more than 130,000 specimens coming from 10 countries: France, Italy, Spain, Algeria, Tunisia, Morocco, Yemen, Syria, Sudan, and Republic of Congo. The collection is now curated by the University of Reims Champagne-Ardenne in France.

== Selected publications ==
The most cited paper by Jean-Antoine Rioux is his classification of Leishmania in 1990.
