= Aephnidiogenes =

Scientific classification
- Kingdom: Animalia
- Phylum: Platyhelminthes
- Class: Trematoda
- Order: Plagiorchiida
- Family: Aephnidiogenidae
- Genus: Aephnidiogenes; Nicoll, 1907

Genus of flukes

Aephnidiogenes is a genus of trematodes in the family Aephnidiogenidae.

== Species ==
- Aephnidiogenes barbarus Nicoll, 1915
- Aephnidiogenes major Yamaguti, 1934
- Aephnidiogenes senegalensis Dollfus & Capron, 1958
