= Austroholorchis =

Scientific classification
- Kingdom: Animalia
- Phylum: Platyhelminthes
- Class: Trematoda
- Order: Plagiorchiida
- Family: Aephnidiogenidae
- Genus: Austroholorchis; Bray & Cribb, 1997

Genus of flukes

Austroholorchis is a genus of trematodes in the family Aephnidiogenidae.

== Species ==
- Austroholorchis levis Bray & Cribb, 1997
- Austroholorchis procerus Bray, Cribb & Pichelin, 1999
- Austroholorchis sprenti (Gibson, 1987) Bray & Cribb, 1997
