= Parasite (journal) =

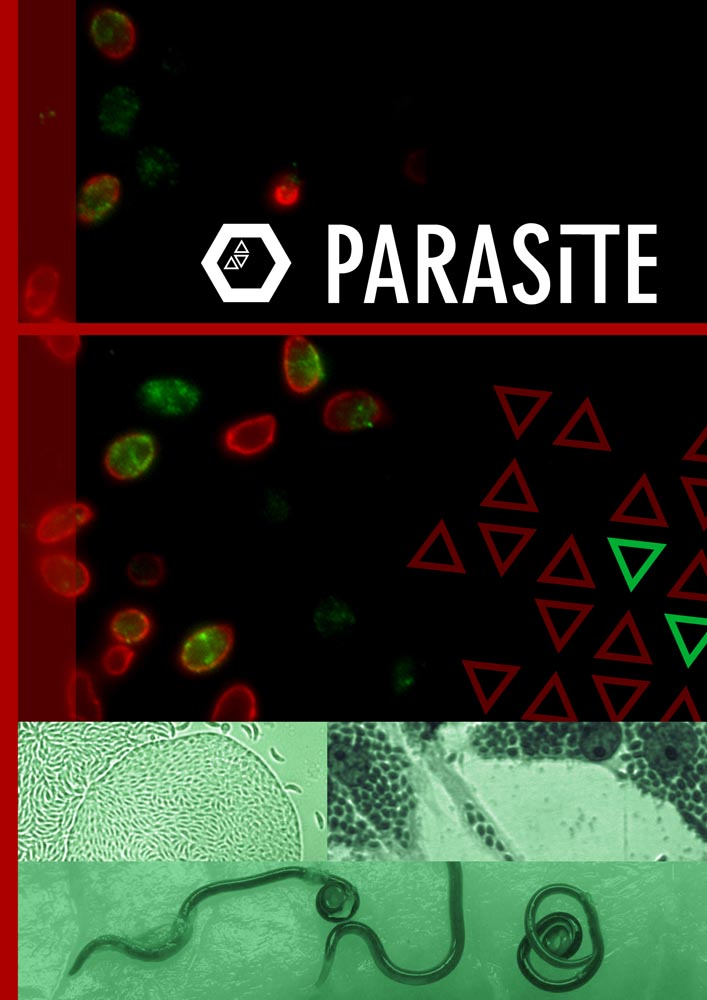
- Discipline: Parasitology
- Language: English
- Edited by: Jean-Lou Justine

Publication details
- Former name: Annales de parasitologie humaine et comparée
- History: 1923–present
- Publisher: EDP Sciences (France)
- Frequency: Upon acceptance
- Open access: Yes
- License: Creative Commons Attribution
- Impact factor: 2.4 (2023)

Standard abbreviations
- ISO 4: Parasite

Indexing
- CODEN: PASIED
- ISSN: 1252-607X (print); 1776-1042 (web)
- LCCN: 48032305
- OCLC no.: 187451846

Links
- Journal homepage; Online access

Parasite is a peer-reviewed open access scientific journal covering all aspects of human and animal parasitology. The journal publishes reviews, articles, and short notes. It is published by EDP Sciences and is an official journal of the Société Française de Parasitologie (English: "French Society of Parasitology"). It is published by EDP Sciences and the editor-in-chief is Jean-Lou Justine (National Museum of Natural History, Paris). The journal was established in 1923 as Annales de Parasitologie Humaine et Comparée and obtained its current title in 1994, with volume numbering restarting at 1.

== Abstracting and indexing ==
The journal is abstracted and indexed in:

- BIOSIS Previews
- CAB International
- Cambridge Scientific Abstracts
- Current Contents/Agriculture, Biology & Environmental Sciences
- Index Medicus/MEDLINE/PubMed
- Science Citation Index
- The Zoological Record

According to the Journal Citation Reports, the journal has a 2023 impact factor of 2.4, ranking it 16th out of 45 journals in the category "Parasitology".
