= Pseudaephnidiogenes =

Scientific classification
- Kingdom: Animalia
- Phylum: Platyhelminthes
- Class: Trematoda
- Order: Plagiorchiida
- Family: Aephnidiogenidae
- Genus: Pseudaephnidiogenes; Yamaguti, 1971

Genus of flukes

Pseudaephnidiogenes is a genus of trematodes in the family Aephnidiogenidae.

== Species ==
- Pseudaephnidiogenes africanus (Fischthal & Thomas, 1972) Bray, 1985
- Pseudaephnidiogenes rhabdosargi (Prudhoe, 1956) Yamaguti, 1971
- Pseudaephnidiogenes rossi Bray, 1985
