= Jardin botanique de Saint Xist =

Botanical garden in France

Coordinates: 43°49′55″N 3°10′24″E

The Jardin botanique de Saint Xist (900 m^{2}) is a botanical garden located in Le Clapier, Aveyron, Midi-Pyrénées, France. It is open weekends without charge in the warmer months.

The garden is located adjacent to the 10th-century church of Saint Xist, and contains nearly 300 species of herbs and medicinal plants as were once found in the monastery's "garden of simples". It is maintained in association with the Jardin des plantes de Montpellier.

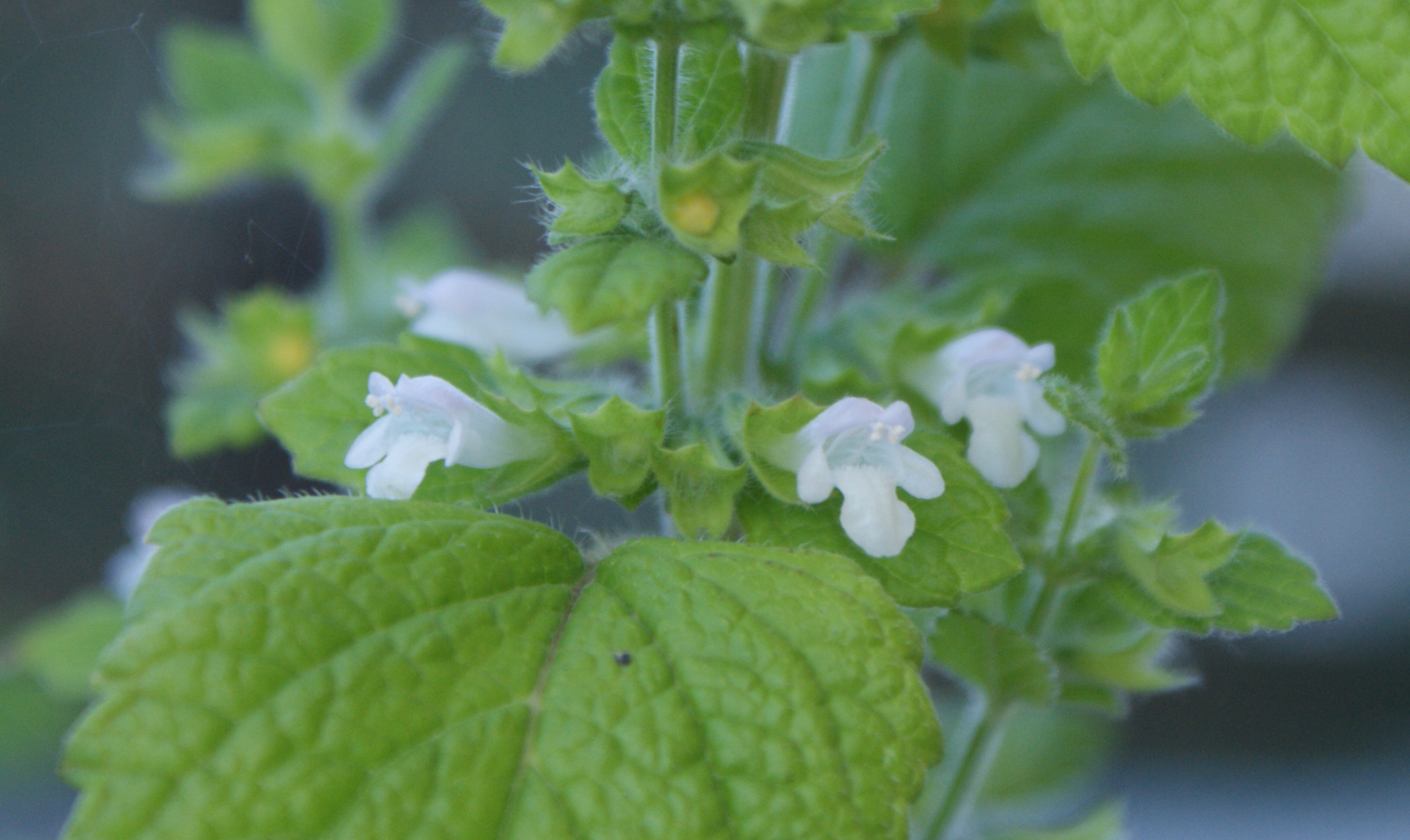
Jardin botanique de Saint Xist

== See also ==
- List of botanical gardens in France
