= Pseudorhabdosynochus justinei =

Scientific classification
- Kingdom: Animalia
- Phylum: Platyhelminthes
- Class: Monogenea
- Order: Dactylogyridea
- Family: Diplectanidae
- Genus: Pseudorhabdosynochus
- Species: P. justinei

Binomial name
- Pseudorhabdosynochus justinei Zeng & Yang, 2007

Species of flatworm

Pseudorhabdosynochus justinei is a species of diplectanid monogenean that is parasitic on the gills of the longfin grouper Epinephelus quoyanus. It was described in 2007 by Binjian Zeng and Tingbao Yang from material from the South China Sea, and redescribed in 2009 by Justine, Dupoux & Cribb from material from off Queensland, Australia.

== Description ==
Pseudorhabdosynochus justinei is a small monogenean, 0.3-0.5 mm in length. The species has the general characteristics of other species of Pseudorhabdosynochus, with a flat body and a posterior haptor, which is the organ by which the monogenean attaches itself to the gill of is host. The haptor bears two squamodiscs, one ventral and one dorsal. The sclerotized male copulatory organ, or "quadriloculate organ", has the shape of a bean with four internal chambers, as in other species of Pseudorhabdosynochus.

The vagina includes a sclerotized part, which is a complex structure. The authors of the species found that Pseudorhabdosynochus caledonicus Justine, 2005 was the closest species in term of vaginal structure.

== Etymology ==
The authors of the species wrote that Pseudorhabdosynochus justinei was named after French parasitologist Jean-Lou Justine "in appreciation for his help in the differentiation of this species and in recognition of his extensive research on the species of Pseudorhabdosynochus".

== Hosts and localities ==
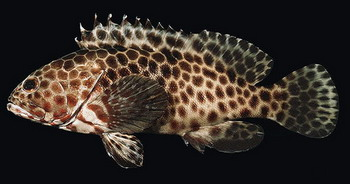
The grouper Epinephelus quoyanus is the host of P. justinei

The type-host of P. justinei is the longfin grouper Epinephelus quoyanus (Serranidae: Epinephelinae). The type-locality and only recorded locality is Dapeng Bay, South China Sea, China. The species has also been recorded from the same host fish near Heron Island, off Queensland, Australia.
