= Le Clapier =

Commune in Occitanie, France

- Commune
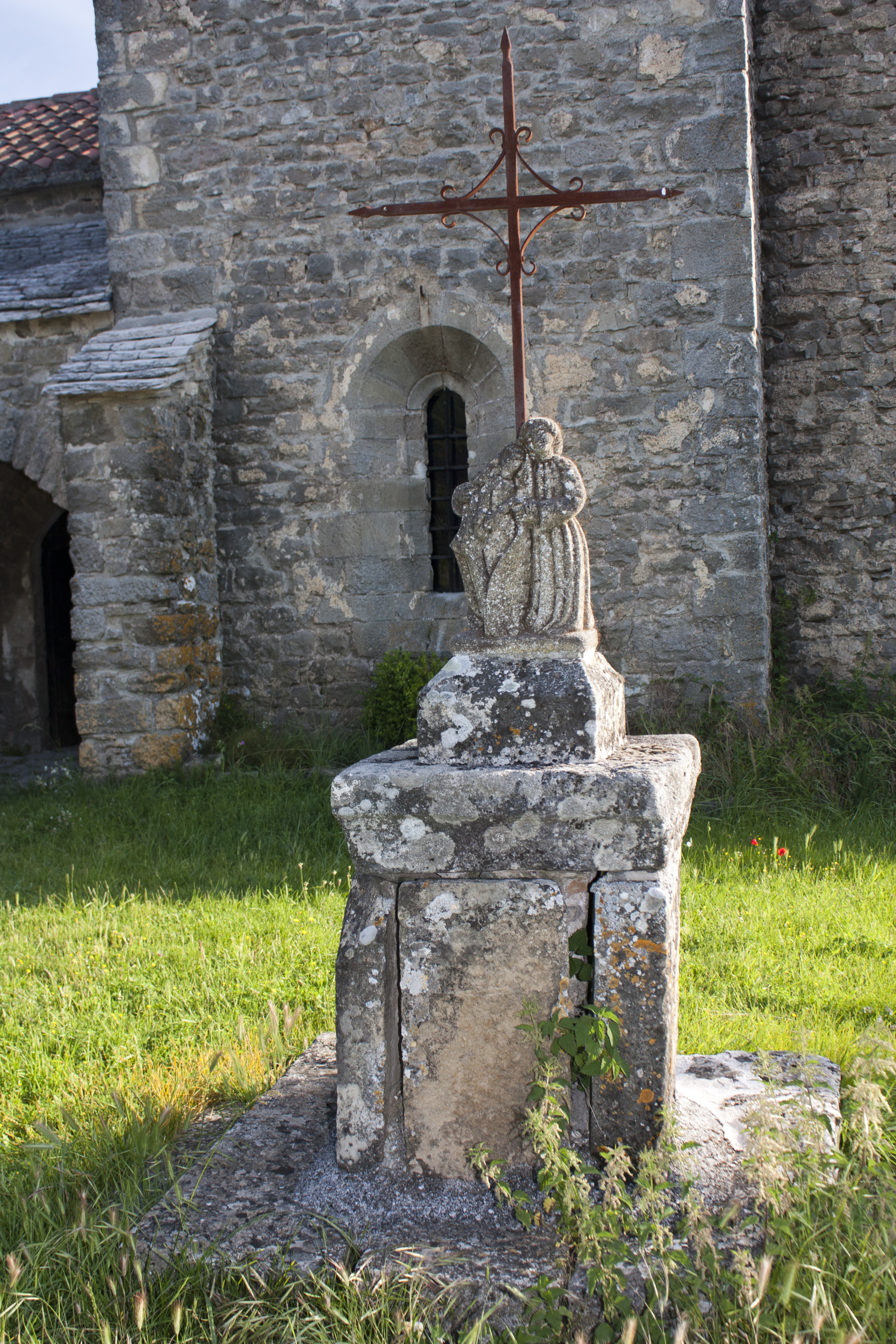
- The calvary in the church grounds

- Coat of arms
- Location of Le Clapier
- Location within France Location within Occitanie
- Coordinates: 43°49′55″N 3°10′24″E
- Country: France
- Region: Occitania
- Department: Aveyron
- Arrondissement: Millau
- Canton: Causses-Rougiers

Government
  - Mayor (2020–2026): Philippe Gout
- Area^{1}: 19.6 km^{2} (7.6 sq mi)
- Elevation: 648 m (2,126 ft)
- Highest elevation: 803 m (2,635 ft)
- Lowest elevation: 459 m (1,506 ft)
- Population (2023): 96
  - Density: 4.9/km^{2} (13/sq mi)
- Time zone: UTC+01:00 (CET)
  - Summer (DST): UTC+02:00 (CEST)
- INSEE/Postal code: 12067 /12540
- ^{1} French Land Register data, which excludes lakes, ponds, glaciers > 1 km^{2} (0.386 sq mi or 247 acres) and river estuaries.

Le Clapier (French pronunciation: [lə klapje]; Occitan: Lo Clapièr) is a commune in the Aveyron department in southern France.

== Population ==
Historical population
Year	Pop.	±% p.a.
1968	96	—
1975	79	−2.75%
1982	71	−1.51%
1990	67	−0.72%
1999	65	−0.34%
2007	77	+2.14%
2012	75	−0.52%
2017	78	+0.79%
2023	96	+3.52%
Source: INSEE

== Geology ==
The village is located 640 meters above sea level, West of the Causse du Larzac, which is 100 or 200 meters higher. The plateau in the region of Le Clapier, which dates from the Sinemurian age, is very stony and has many low walls and heaps of stones, hence the name as "clapier" is a French word for an accumulation of stones in Occitania. Along the slope of Larzac is a thick layer of black marlstones which date from the Toarcian age. It is streaked due to linear erosion and marl may be found in the local prairies. The edge of Larzac (also called the Western Guillhaumard) is made of large white limestone cliffs dating from the Bathonian age. The marls are rich in fossils of marine animals such as Ammonoidea and Belemnoidea. Also, the valley of the Sorgue close to Larzac reveals sediments dating as far back as the Cambrian Series 2. The village is located on the Mediterranean side of the Atlantic and Mediterranean watershed.

== Sights ==
In the center of the village, the Clapier castle is made of the remains of a medieval fort, probably built by the Hospitallers of Jerusalem. The bottom part of a tower contains several arrow slits. It was ruined at the times of the Wars of Religion, but was partially reconstructed in the 17th and 18th centuries to become a farm. Episcopal archives mention that the fort of Clapier was built for pilgrims on the Way of St. James to shelter them from wolves and brigands. It contained dormitories, a bread oven, the commander's residence and a prison.

The Jardin botanique de Saint Xist is also located in Le Clapier.

== See also ==
- Communes of the Aveyron department
