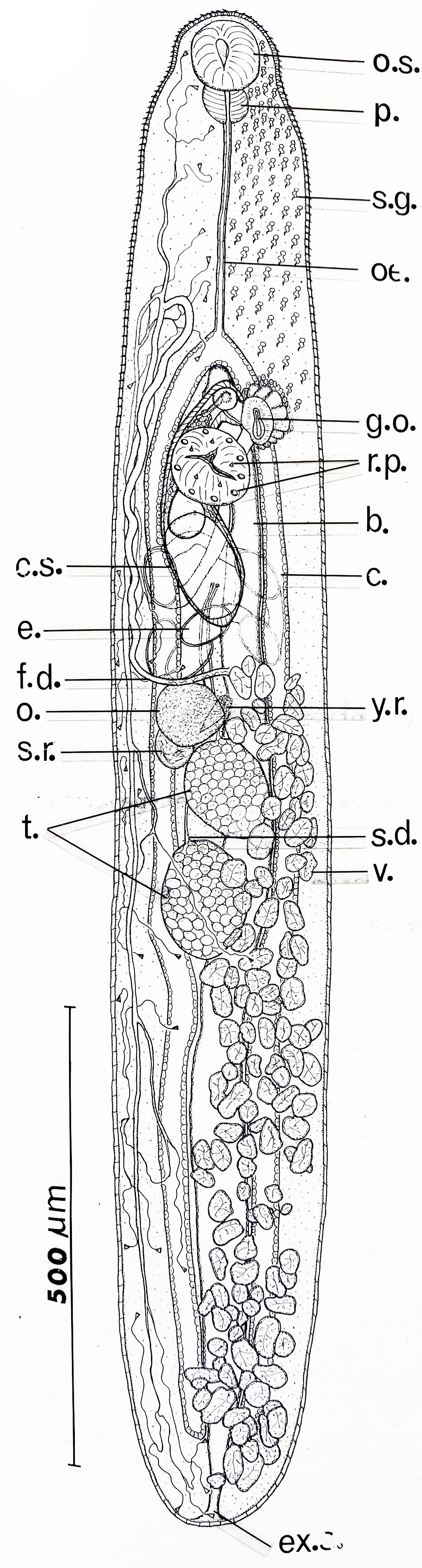
- Drawing of adult trematode Stegodexamene callista (holotype) found in the gut of the long-finned freshwater eel Anguilla reinhardtii caught in creek in Brisbane, Queensland, Australia cerca 1983

Scientific classification
- Kingdom: Animalia
- Phylum: Platyhelminthes
- Class: Trematoda
- Order: Plagiorchiida
- Family: Aephnidiogenidae
- Genus: Stegodexamene; MacFarlane, 1951

= Stegodexamene =

Genus of flukes

Stegodexamene is a genus of trematodes in the family Aephnidiogenidae.

== Species ==
- Stegodexamene anguillae MacFarlane, 1951
- Stegodexamene callista Watson, 1984
- Stegodexamene watsoni Cribb, 1988
