= Aephnidiogenidae =

Scientific classification
- Kingdom: Animalia
- Phylum: Platyhelminthes
- Class: Trematoda
- Order: Plagiorchiida
- Suborder: Lepocreadiata
- Superfamily: Lepocreadioidea
- Family: Aephnidiogenidae; Yamaguti, 1934

Genera
- See text

Family of flukes

Aephnidiogenidae is a family of trematodes in the order Plagiorchiida.

== Genera ==
- Aephnidiogenes Nicoll, 1915
- Austroholorchis Bray & Cribb, 1997
- Holorchis Stossich, 1901
- Neolepocreadium Thomas, 1960
- Pseudaephnidiogenes Yamaguti, 1971
- Stegodexamene MacFarlane, 1951
- Tetracerasta Watson, 1984
