= Neolepocreadium =

Scientific classification
- Kingdom: Animalia
- Phylum: Platyhelminthes
- Class: Trematoda
- Order: Plagiorchiida
- Family: Aephnidiogenidae
- Genus: Neolepocreadium; Thomas, 1960

Genus of flukes

Neolepocreadium is a genus of trematodes in the family Aephnidiogenidae.

== Species ==
- Neolepocreadium ampahan Machida, 2012
- Neolepocreadium caballeroi Thomas, 1960
- Neolepocreadium trachinoti Madhavi, Narasimhulu & Shameem, 1986
