= Jardin des plantes de Montpellier =

Botanical garden in France

Coordinates: 43.6143°N 3.8717°E

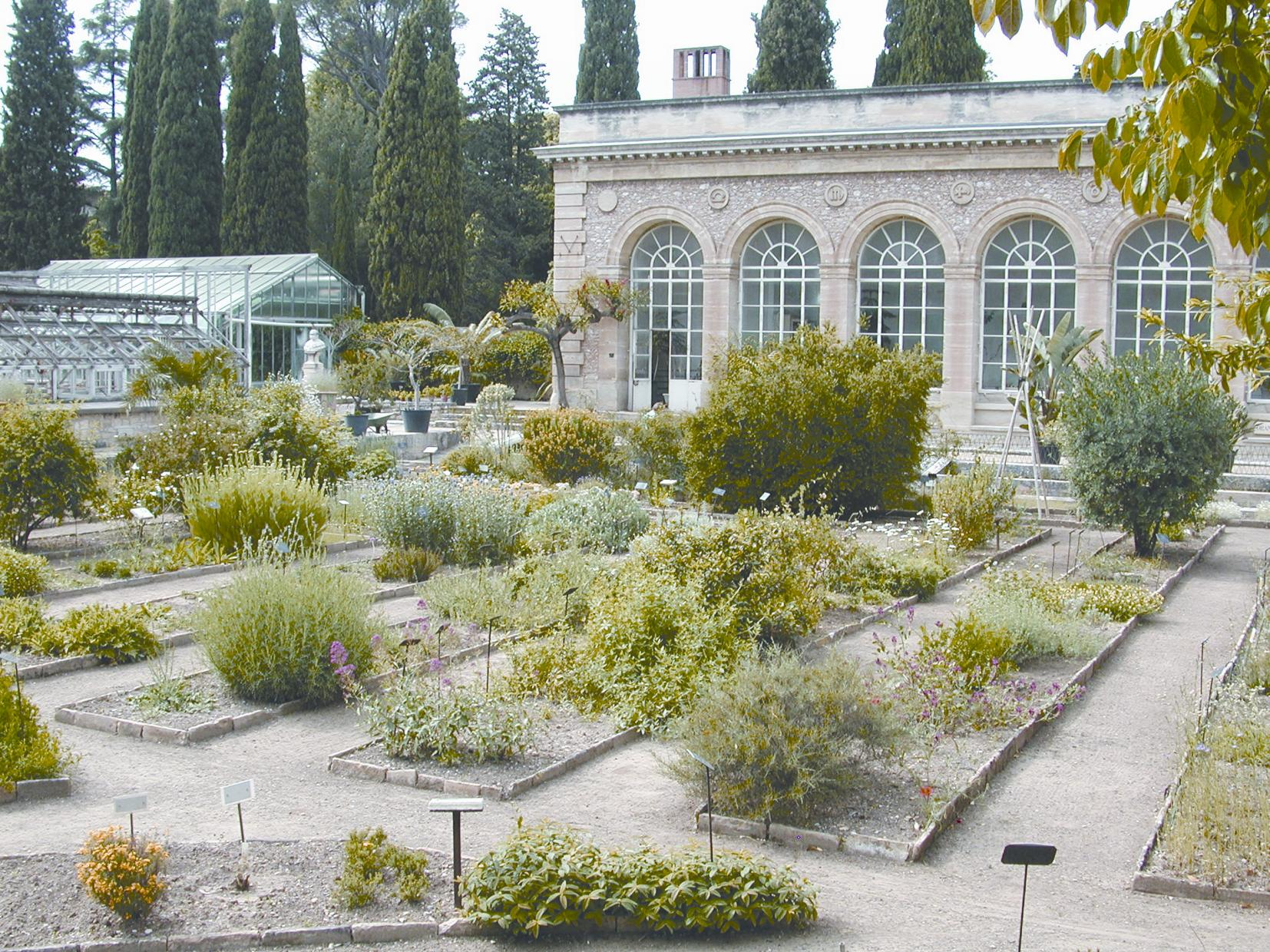
Jardin des plantes de Montpellier

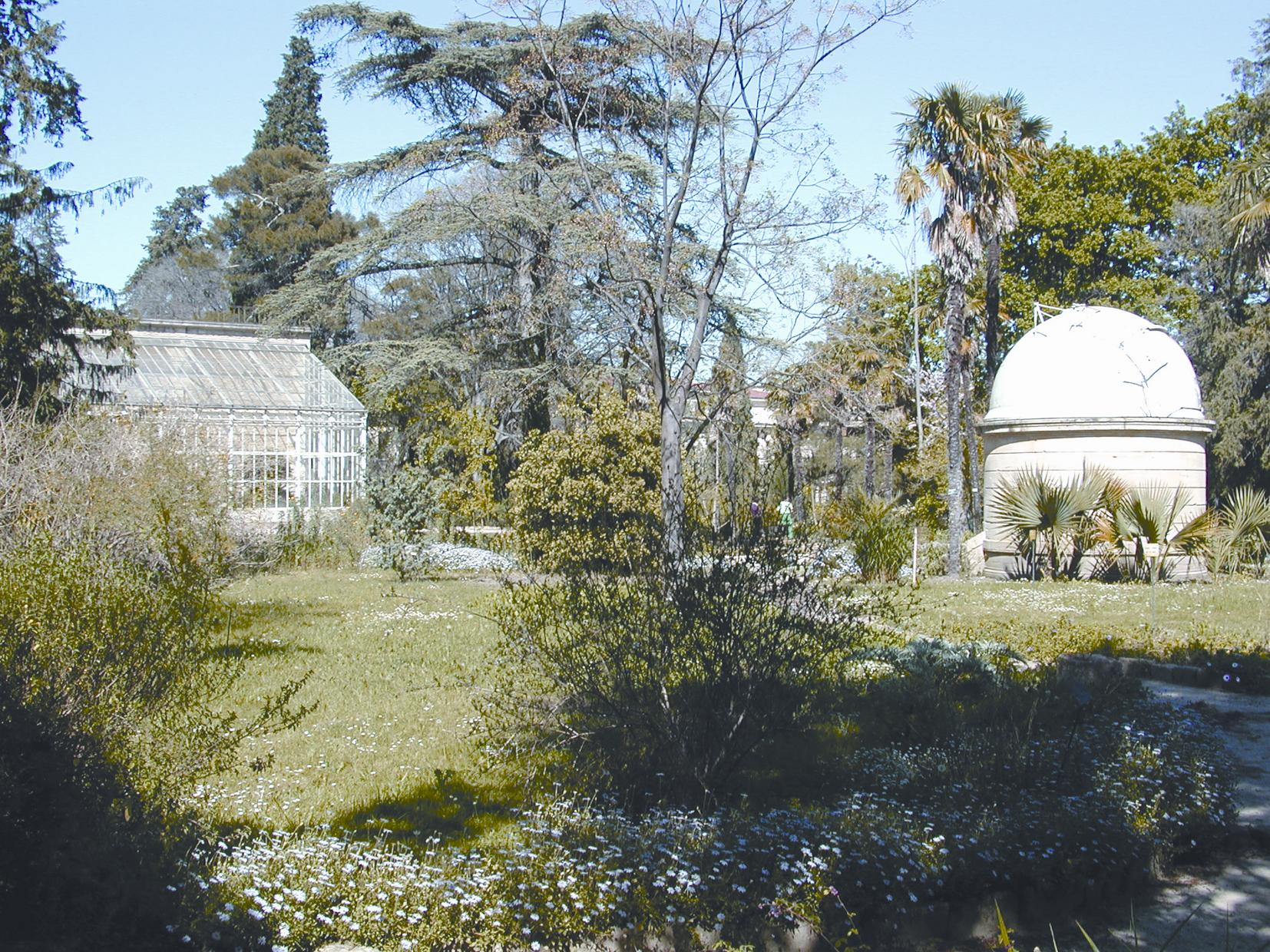
General view of the garden

The jardin des plantes de Montpellier (4.5 hectares) is a historic botanical garden and arboretum located on Boulevard Henri IV, Montpellier, Hérault, Occitania, France. It is maintained by the Université Montpellier 1 and open afternoons daily except Monday; admission is free.

The garden was established in 1593 by letters patent from King Henri IV, under the leadership of Pierre Richer de Belleval, professor of botany and anatomy. It is France's oldest botanical garden, inspired by the Orto botanico di Padova (1545) and in turn serving as model for the jardin des plantes de Paris (1626).

The Montagne de Richer lies within the garden's oldest section, which also now contains a systematic garden. The garden was expanded twice in the 19th century. Its orangery was designed by Claude-Mathieu Delagardette (1762–1805) and completed in 1804, the arboretum was landscaped in 1810, and the English Garden, with pool and greenhouse, dates from 1859. The monumental Martins greenhouse opened in 1860.

Today the garden contains about 2,680 plant species, including 500 native to the Mediterranean region. Of these roughly 2,000 species are grown outdoors, and 1,000 under glass. Major sections of the garden are as follows:

- Montagne de Richer - a Cistaceae collection
- Systematic garden - plants classified according to the Bentham & Hooker system, 1883, complemented by Elias Durand, 1887.
- Medicinal plants - about 250 plants of traditional Mediterranean medicines and herbs
- Succulents - about 50 species
- Orangery and cold greenhouse - about 110 species
- Palm trees - 9 varieties, including Brahea armata and Butia capitata.
- Arboretum - Fine mature specimens including Acer neapolitanum, Celtis sinensis, Cinnamomum camphora, Cupressus goveniana, Cupressus macrocarpa, Cupressus sempervirens, Quercus calliprinos, Quercus coccifera, and Zelkova serrata. The male Ginkgo biloba, planted in the late 18th century, is particularly noteworthy.
- Greenhouse - 423 species in three rooms, including a tropical room with large central basin for aquatic plants, and two temperate rooms. Of interest are the collections of ferns, Bromeliaceae, and Orchidaceae, with good collections from French Guiana.
- Naturalized plants - including Delphinium requienii, Fumaria bicolor, Fumaria kralikii, Linaria reflexa, Modiola caroliniana, Salpichroa origanifolia, Symphytum orientale, and Stipa trichotoma.

== See also ==
- Jardin botanique de Saint Xist, an affiliate garden
- List of botanical gardens in France
- Jean-Antoine Rioux, Director (1977-1993) of the garden
