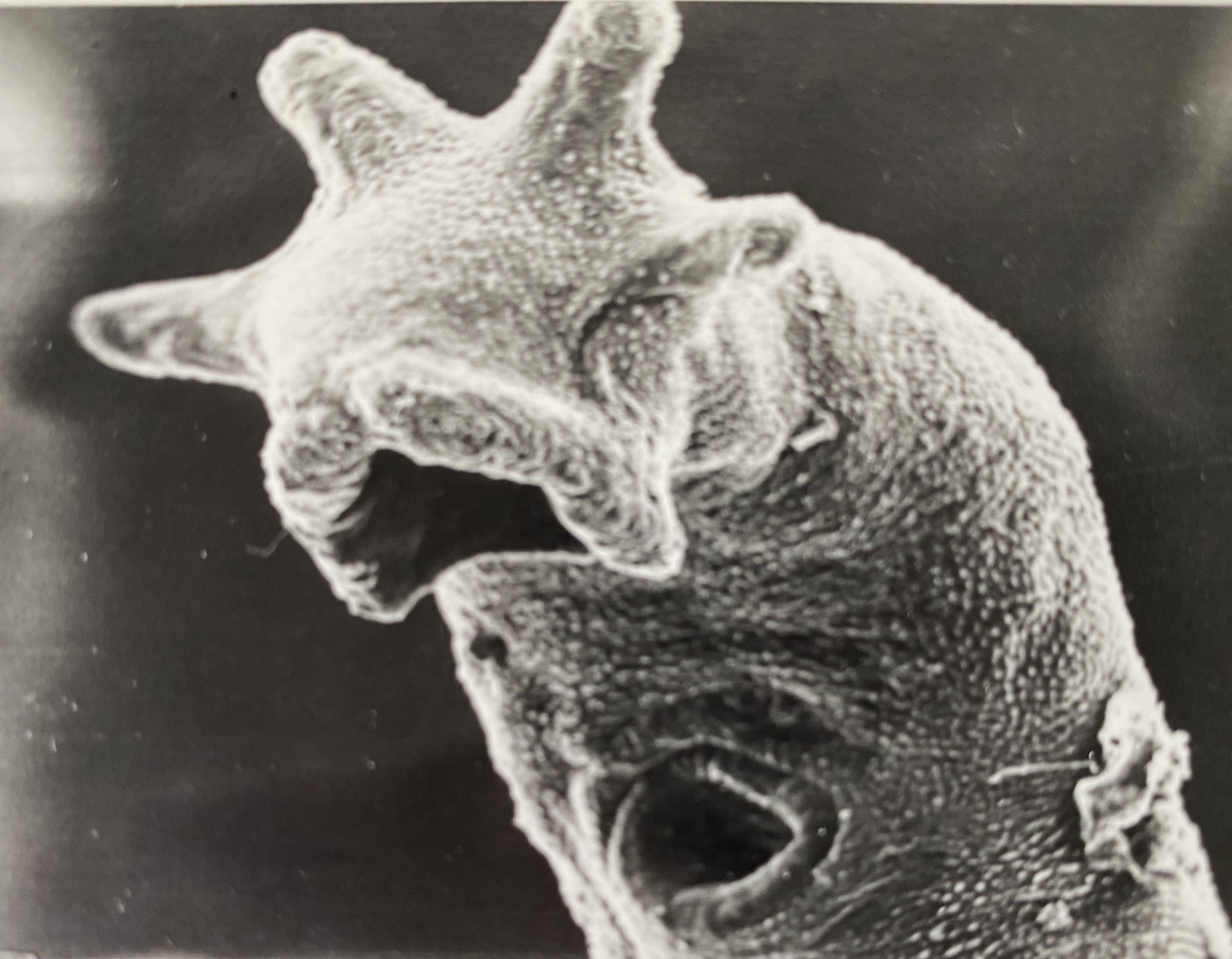
- Tetracerasta blepta adult anterior with oral lobes and suckers
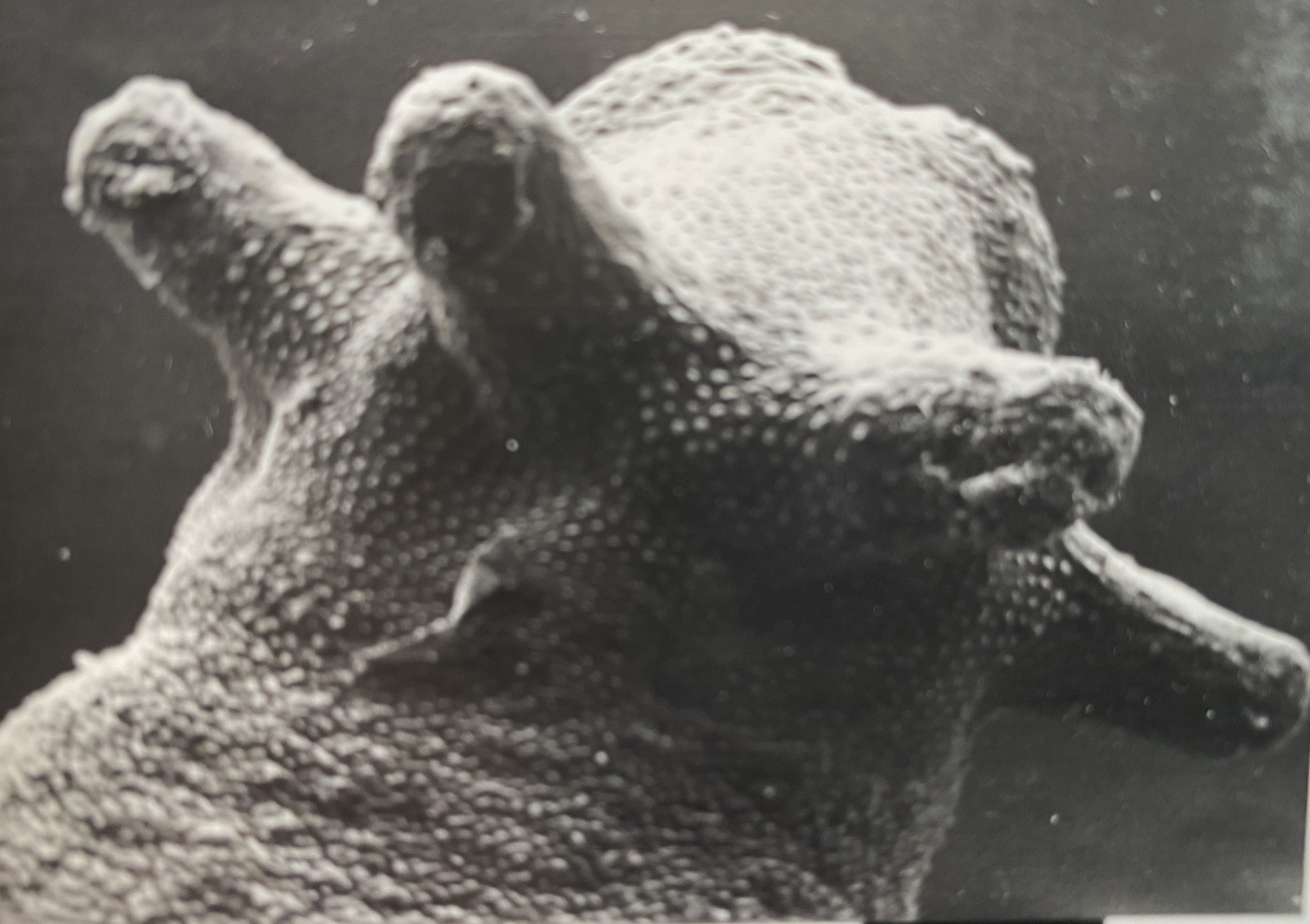
- Tetracerasta blepta adult anterior with oral lobes dorsal view

Scientific classification
- Kingdom: Animalia
- Phylum: Platyhelminthes
- Class: Trematoda
- Order: Plagiorchiida
- Family: Aephnidiogenidae
- Genus: Tetracerasta; Watson, 1984
- Species: T. blepta

Binomial name
- Tetracerasta blepta Watson, 1984

= Tetracerasta =

Genus of flukes

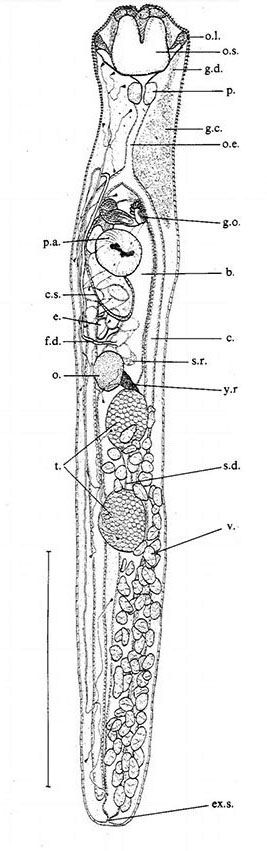
Trematode adult of Tetracerasta blepta (scale line is 500 μm). Holotype specimen collected from the gut of longfin freshwater eel Anguilla reinhardtii caught in freshwater creek in Brisbane, Queensland, Australia circa 1983.

Tetracerasta is a genus of trematodes in the family Aephnidiogenidae. It consists of one species, Tetracerasta blepta Watson, 1984.
