= Société Française de Parasitologie =

French scientific society

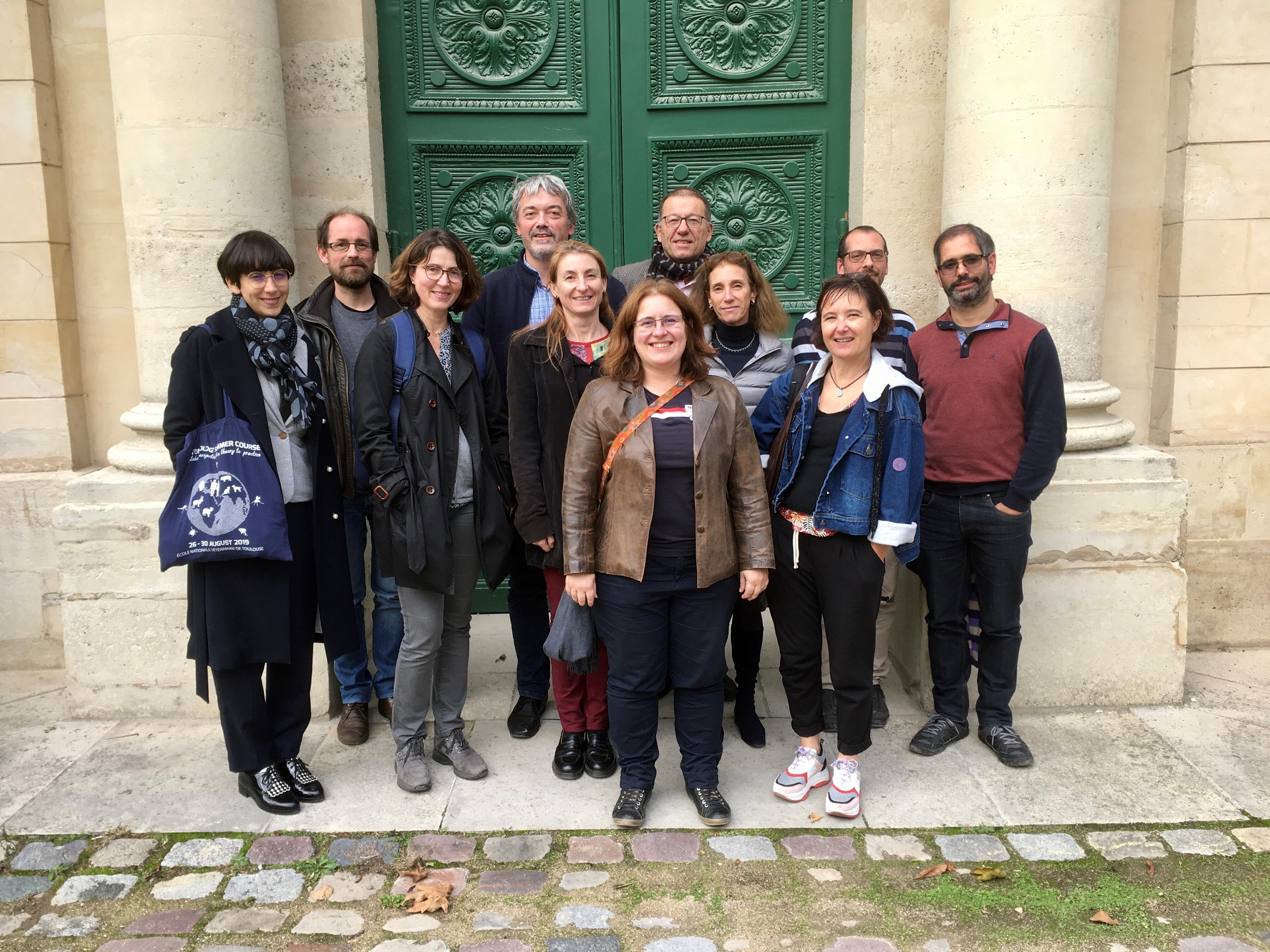
- Council of the Société Française de Parasitologie, October 2019
- Abbreviation: SFP
- Formation: 1962
- Type: Learned society
- Purpose: Promoting parasitology
- Location: Paris, France
- Official language: French
- President: Isabelle Villena
- Secretary: Frédéric Grenouillet
- Website: link

La Société Française de Parasitologie (English: "French Society of Parasitology"), often abridged as SFP, was founded in 1962 and is a scientific society devoted to parasitology. It publishes the scientific journal Parasite and organizes prizes and annual meetings.

== History ==
The Society was created at a meeting hold on April 7, 1962 at the Muséum National d’Histoire Naturelle in Paris, called by Jacques Callot (from Strasbourg), Jean Biguet (from Lille), Alain Chabaud (from Paris), and Claude Dupuis (from Paris). Among the 25 founding members were Lucien Brumpt, Pierre Paul Grassé, Edouard Brygoo, Jean-Marie Doby, Louis Euzet, Hervé Harant and Jean-Antoine Rioux.

== Publications ==
The Society published from 1981 to 1999 the Bulletin de la Société Française de Parasitologie, now extinct.

Since 1994, the Society publishes the scientific journal Parasite. The journal was published as a printed journal from 1994 to 2012 and is an online open-access journal since 2013.

== List of presidents ==
- 1962-1976: Robert-Philippe Dollfus
- 1976-1982: Jean Biguet
- 1982-1999: Jean-Antoine Rioux
- 1998-2002: René Houin
- 2001-2004: Philippe Dorchies
- 2003-2007: Gérard Duvallet
- 2006-2011: Marie-Laure Dardé
- 2012-2017: Pascal Boireau
- 2017-2018: Laurence Delhaes
- 2018-2019: Coralie Martin
- 2020-2024: Isabelle Villena
- 2024 -: Grégory Karadjian

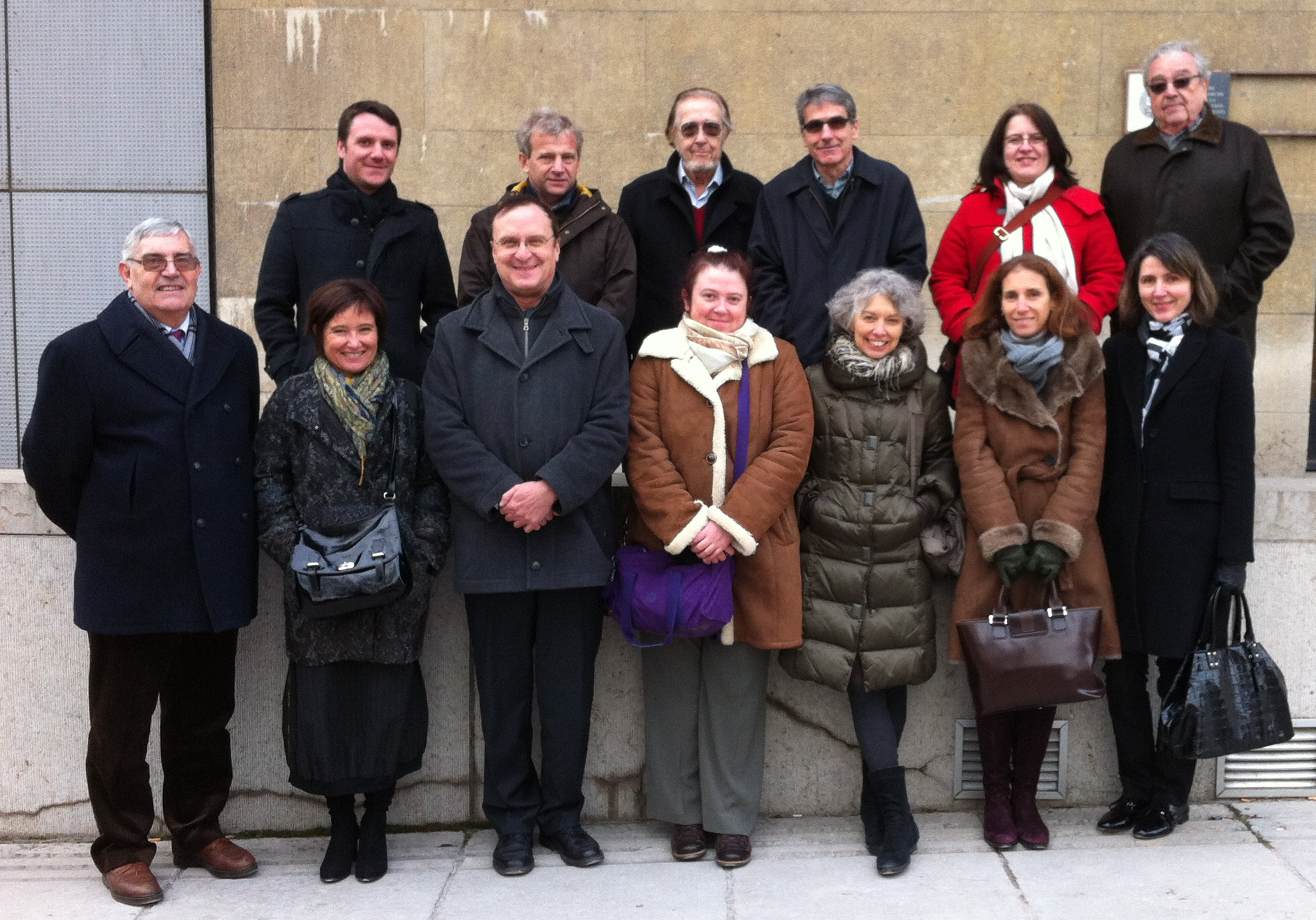
Council of the Société Française de Parasitologie - January 2015
