= Claude Combes =

French biologist and parasitologist (1935–2021)

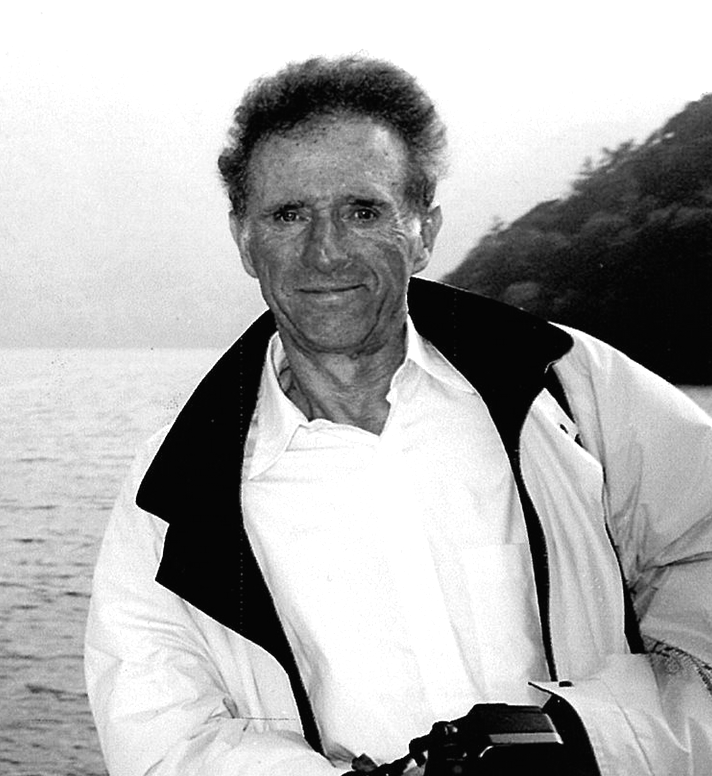
Claude Combes

Claude Combes (22 July 1935 – 8 July 2021) was a French biologist and parasitologist. He was a professor of animal biology and director of the Centre de Biologie et Écologie Tropicale et Méditerranéenne at the Université de Perpignan.

Combes got his aggregation of natural sciences in 1958 and a doctoral degree in 1967.

He received several scientific awards including the CNRS Silver Medal (1986), Skryabin Medal (USSR Academy of Sciences) (1991), Philip Morris Research Prize (1990).

Combes was a member of the French Academy of Sciences from 1996. He died on 8 July 2021, at the age of 85.

== Books ==
- La Vie, 2002 Ellipses (L'esprit des sciences)
- Taxonomie, écologie et évolution des métazoaires parasites. (Taxonomy, ecology and evolution of metazoan parasites), 2003 PUP
- The Art of Being a Parasite, 2005 The University of Chicago Press (2003 in French)
- Encyclopedic Reference of Parasitology, (2nd edition, 38 co-authors), 2002 Springer
- Interactions durables. Ecologie et évolution du parasitisme, 1995 Masson (Ecologie, 26)
- L'homme et l'animal. De Lascaux à la vache folle, 1999 Belin (Pour la Science)
- Les associations du vivant : l'art d'être parasite, 2001 Flammarion
- Parasitism. The Ecology and Evolution of Intimate Interactions. 2001 University of Chicago Press

== Honors and awards ==
- Knight of the Ordre National du Mérite (1986)
- Knight of the Order of Legion of Honour (1991)
