= Louis Euzet =

French parasitologist (1923–2013)

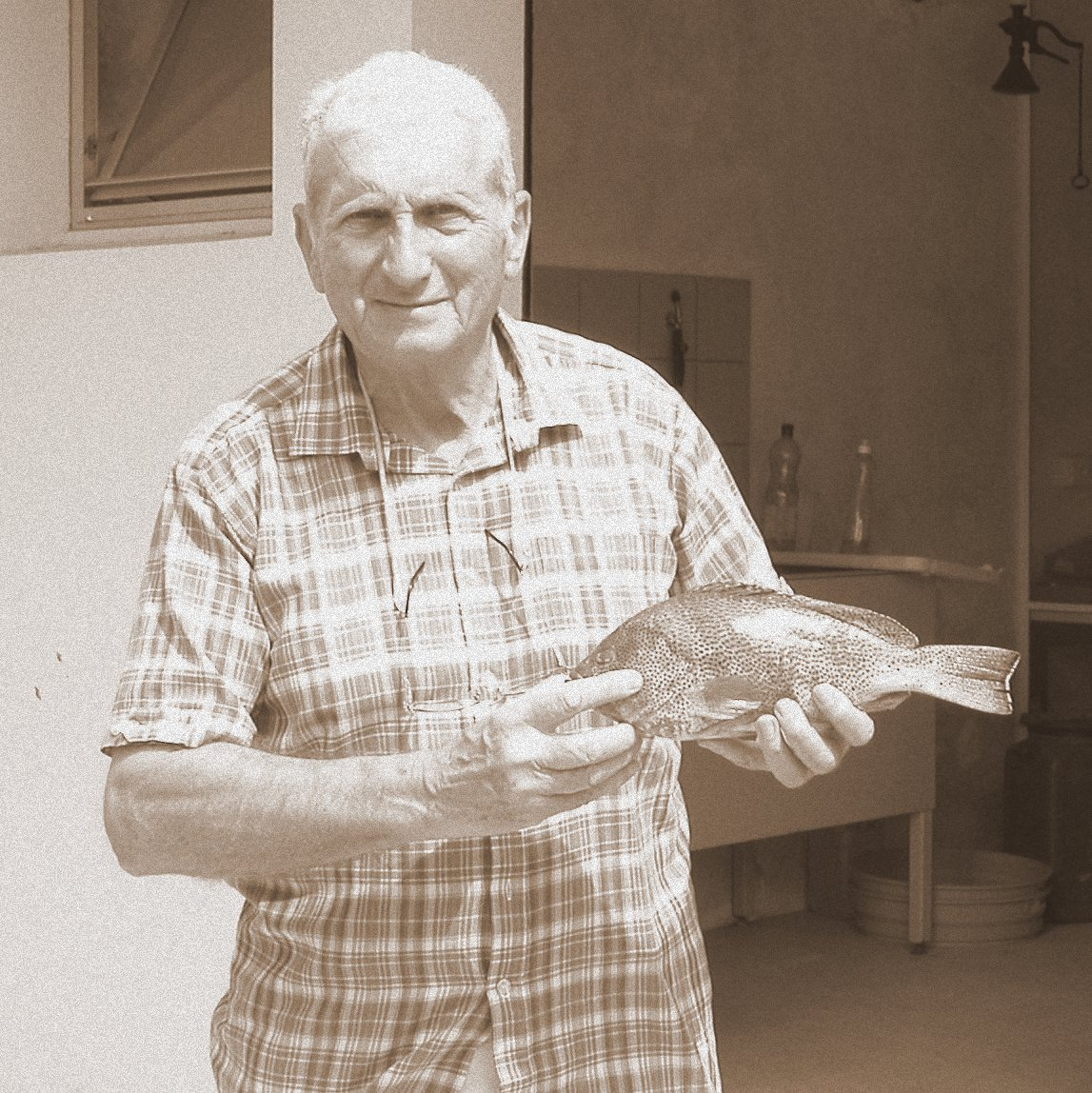
- Louis Euzet in 2003
- Born: July 27, 1923; Lézignan-Corbières, France
- Died: September 24, 2013 (aged 90); Sète, France
- Citizenship: French
- Education: University of Montpellier, France
- Known for: Monogenea, Cestoda
- Awards: Honorary member, American Society of Parasitologists; Honorary member, Helminthological Society of Washington; Doctor Honoris Causa, Université de Neuchâtel
- Scientific career
- Fields: Parasitology, Helminthology
- Workplaces: University of Montpellier, Station Biologique de Sète
- Thesis: Recherches sur les Cestodes Tétraphyllides des Sélaciens des côtes de France (1956)
- Notable students: Claude Combes
- Author abbrev. (zoology): Euzet

Louis Euzet (27 July 1923 in Lézignan-Corbières, France – 24 September 2013 in Sète, France) was a French parasitologist.

== Education ==
Louis Euzet was a high-school student in Narbonne, France, and a student of the University of Montpellier (in the then “Faculté des Sciences”). He obtained his bachelor's degree (Licence) in 1947. He prepared his doctoral thesis in the Station de Biologie Marine at Sète, under the direction of Paul Mathias and Jean-George Baer; the thesis, on tetraphyllidean cestodes, was accepted on 16 June 1956.

== Career ==
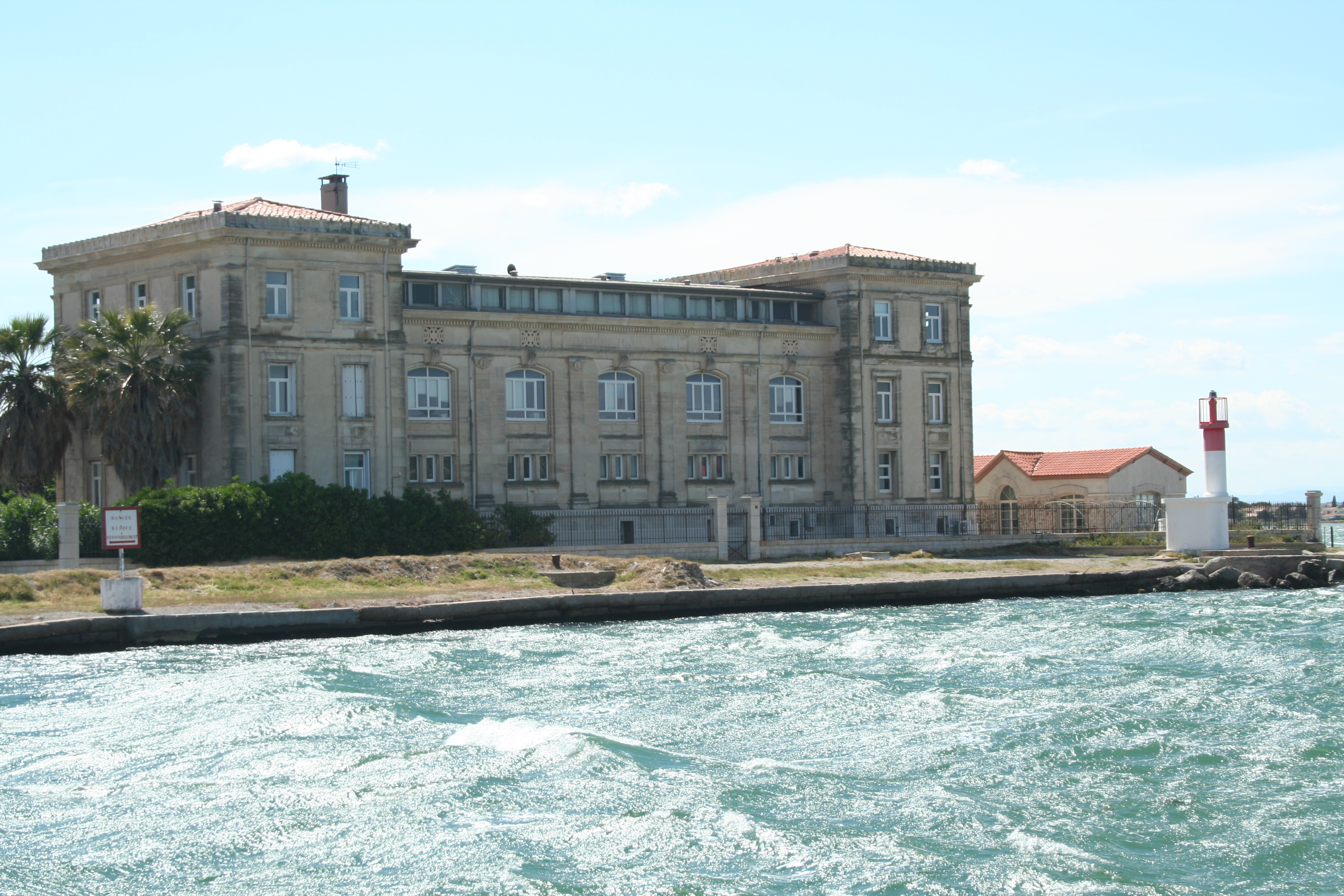
The Station de Biologie Marine in Sète

Louis Euzet was a junior lecturer at the Station de Biologie Marine in Sète in 1947. He was appointed Professor in the recently created “Collège Scientifique Universitaire” at Perpignan in 1959. He moved in 1969 to the University of Montpellier, where he established his Laboratoire de Parasitologie Comparée (Laboratory of Comparative Parasitology). He retired in 1991, became an Emeritus Professor in 1992 and pursued his scientific work at the Station de Biologie Marine in Sète, where he was still active in 2012, aged 89. He occupied the same room in the Station de Biologie Marine at Sète for more than 60 years.

== Scientific work and influence ==
After a doctoral thesis on parasitic cestodes, Euzet progressively extended his expertise to monogeneans and a variety of fish parasites. He authored about 200 scientific publications between 1951 and 2012, described more than 60 new species of cestodes and more than 200 new species of monogeneans, and worked on the life-cycles and evolution of parasites. With his students, he also worked on monogeneans of freshwater fishes from several countries in Africa (Benin, Chad, Côte d'Ivoire). He also wrote seminal work on parasite specificity and the speciation of both monogeneans and cestodes. Louis Euzet created the concept of alloxenic speciation, i.e. the speciation of parasites linked with the behaviour and ecology of the host, and was one of the first to propose schemes of coevolution between monogeneans and elasmobranchs. His laboratory in Montpellier was a hub where many students and researchers visited, and his small laboratory in the Station de Biologie Marine at Sète was still much frequented 10 years after his official retirement.

Most of Louis Euzet's scientific work was devoted to the Mediterranean, but he also worked on parasites from almost all of the world's seas. He travelled and collected parasites in many countries, including Africa (Senegal, Benin, Cameroon, Mali, Madagascar, Morocco, Tunisia, Algeria), the United States, Mexico, India, Indonesia, French Polynesia and New Caledonia.

Louis Euzet created a school of parasitology named “montpelliéro-perpignanaise” (from both Montpellier and Perpignan, France) and his students are now researchers or university professors in many countries. He supervised more than twenty theses and co-supervised about fifty more. These studies concerned many and various aspects of the relationships between marine organisms and parasites, including systematics, ecology, life-cycles, life history, phylogeny, studies on vector molluscs, modelling and population dynamics. Among his students who continued a successful career in parasitology were Academician Claude Combes, Guy Oliver, Claude Maillard, Alain Lambert, Antoine Pariselle and Jean-Lou Justine (France), Isaure de Buron (United States), Mohamed Hedi Ktari, Fadhila Mokhtar-Maamouri, Lamia Gargouri, Lobna Boudaya and Lassad Neifar (Tunisia), Nezha Noury-Sraïri (deceased) and Ouafae Berrada-Rkhami (Morocco), Faïza Amine, Nadia Kechemir-Issad and Fadila Tazerouti (Algeria), and Branko M. Radujković (Montenegro).

In 2003, many of his former students and several researchers from all parts of the world happily contributed to a two-volume Festschrift in his honour entitled “Taxonomy, Ecology and Evolution of Metazoan Parasites”.

Louis Euzet's huge collections of parasitic worms, consisting in more than 10,000 fully labelled, stained and mounted specimens of Monogenea and Cestoda on microscope slides prepared by himself, are deposited in the Muséum National d’Histoire Naturelle in Paris.

== Honours ==
- Honorary membership, American Society of Parasitologists, United States (1988)
- Honorary membership, Helminthological Society of Washington, United States (1992)
- Doctor Honoris Causa of the Université de Neuchâtel, Switzerland (1982)
- Prix Trégouboff de l’Académie des Sciences, France (1987)
- Grand Prix des Sciences de la Mer, Académie des Sciences, France (1997)

== Taxa named in his honour ==
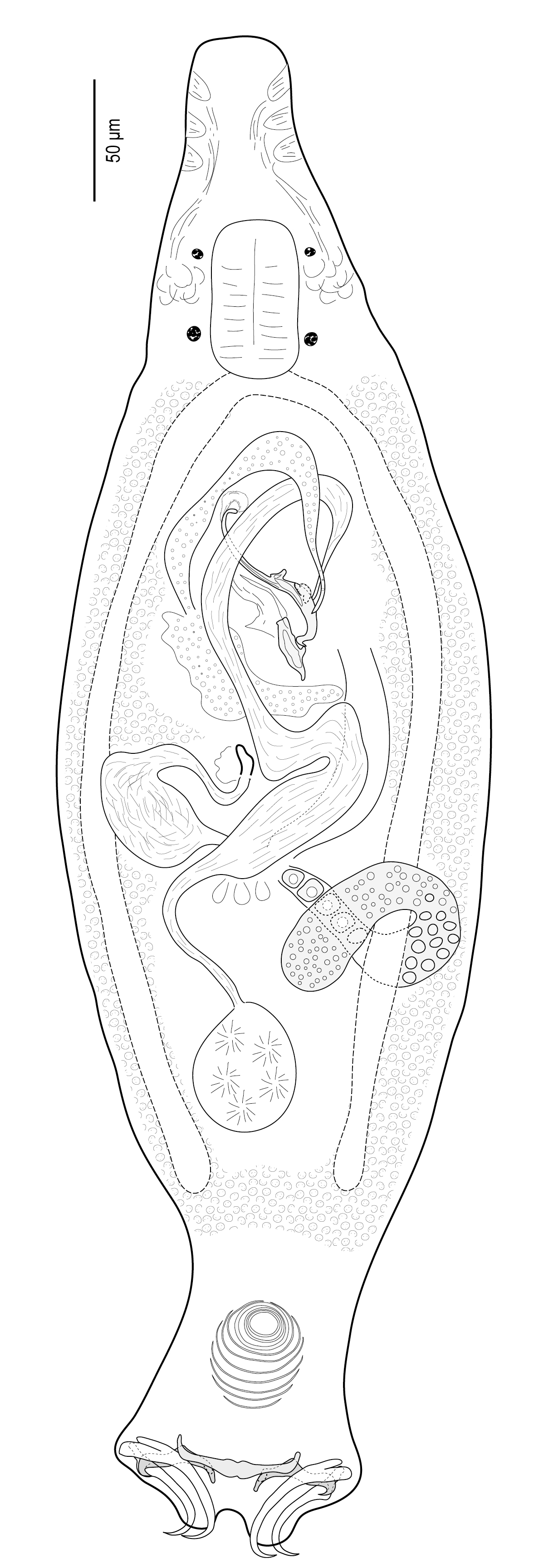
Calydiscoides euzeti

A number of taxa were named in the honour of Louis Euzet by many researchers. Most of these taxa are parasites. They include 5 genera and a large number of species.

Genera include Euzetiella de Chambrier, Rego & Vaucher, 1999 (Cestoda), Euzetia Chisholm & Whittington, 2001, Euzetplectanocotyle Mamaev & Tkachuk, 1979 and Euzetrema Combes, 1965 (Monogenea), and Euzetacanthus Golvan & Houin, 1964 (Acanthocephala). Note: Euzetes Berlese, 1908 (Acari), was clearly not named after Louis Euzet.

Mosts species named after Euzet are parasitic Platyhelminthes (Cestoda, Monogenea, Digenea). Species of Cestoda: Floriparicapitus euzeti Cielocha, Jensen & Caira, 2014, Halysioncum euzeti (Campbell & Carvajal 1980) Caira, Marques, Jensen, Kuchta & Ivanov, 2014, Progrillotia louiseuzeti Dollfus, 1969, Proteocephalus euzeti Chambrier & Vaucher, 1992, Rhinebothrium euzeti Williams, 1958. Species of Monogenea: Calydiscoides euzeti Justine, 2007, Cichlidogyrus euzeti Dossou & Birgi, 1984, Gyrodactylus euzeti Prost, 1993, Heteraxine louiseuzeti De Armas et al. in Lopez-Roman & Armas Hernandez, 1989, Lamellodiscus euzeti Diamanka, Boudaya, Toguebaye & Pariselle, 2011, Lamellodiscus louiseuzeti Diamanka, Drame & Pariselle, 2026, Ligophorus euzeti Dmitrieva & Gerasev, 1996, Merizocotyle euzeti Irigoitia, Cantatore, Delpiani, Incorvaia, Lanfranchi & Timi, 2014, Metacamopiella euzeti Kohn, Santos & Lebedev, 1996, Neopolystoma euzeti Combes & Ktari, 1975, Notozothecium euzeti Kritsky, Boeger & Jegu, 1996, Pauciconfibula euzeti (Ktari, 1971) Chisholm, Beverley-Burton & McAlpine, 1991, Protocotyle euzetmaillardi Justine, 2011, Squalonchocotyle euzeti Kheddam, Justine & Tazerouti, 2016, Thaparocleidus euzeti Pariselle, Lim & Lambert, 2002, and Triloculotrema euzeti Boudaya & Neifar, 2016. Species of Digenea: Anaporrhutum euzeti Curran, Blend & Overstreet, 2003, Elaphrobates euzeti Bullard & Overstreet, 2003, Gorgodera euzeti Lees & Combes, 1968, Hurleytrematoides euzeti McNamara, Adlard, Bray, Sasal & Cribb, 2012, Lecithophyllum euzeti Gibson & Bray, 2003, and Stephanostomum euzeti Bartoli & Bray, 2004. The list also includes an Acanthocephala, Harpagorhynchus golvaneuzeti Kvach & de Buron, 2019, a Myxozoa, Myxidium euzeti Lubat, Radujkovic, Marques & Bouix, 1989, a Coccidia, Eimeria euzeti Daoudi, Radujkovic, Marques & Bouix, 1987, a Gregarina, Erhardovina euzeti (Lipa, 1982) Levine, 1985 and a Microsporidia, Unikaryon euzeti Toguebaye & Marchand, 1988.

== Examples of works by Louis Euzet ==
This short list is based on most cited works by Louis Euzet according to Google Scholar.

- Euzet, L.; Swiderski, Z.; Mokhtar-Maamouri, F. (1981). "Ultrastructure comparée du spermatozoïde des cestodes. Relations avec la phylogénèse". Annales de Parasitologie Humaine et Comparée. 56 (3): 247–259. doi:10.1051/parasite/1981563247. ISSN 0003-4150.
- Pariselle, Antoine; Euzet, Louis (1995). "Gill parasites of the genus Cichlidogyrus Paperna, 1960 (Monogenea, Ancyrocephalidae) from Tilapia guineensis (Bleeker, 1862), with descriptions of six new species". Systematic Parasitology. 30 (3): 187–198. doi:10.1007/BF00010469. ISSN 0165-5752. S2CID 13620269.
- Radujkovic, Branko M., & Euzet, Louis. "Parasites des poissons marins du Monténégro: Monogènes." Acta Adriatica 30 (51) (1989): 135.
- Euzet, Louis & Suriano, M. D. 1977: Ligophorus n. g. (Monogenea, Ancyrocephalidae) parasite des Mugilidae (Téleostéens) en Méditerranée. Bulletin du Muséum National d'Histoire Naturelle, Paris, 3eme série, 472, 797-822. PDF
- Guégan, Jean-François; Lambert, Alain; Lévêque, Christian; Combes, Claude; Euzet, Louis (1992). "Can host body size explain the parasite species richness in tropical freshwater fishes?". Oecologia. 90 (2): 197–204. Bibcode:1992Oecol..90..197G. doi:10.1007/BF00317176. ISSN 0029-8549. PMID 28313714. S2CID 18452657.
- Euzet, Louis; Combes, Claude (1998). "The selection of habitats among the monogenea". International Journal for Parasitology. 28 (10): 1645–1652. doi:10.1016/S0020-7519(98)00062-9. ISSN 0020-7519. PMID 9801922.
