= Pseudorhabdosynochus dionysos =

Scientific classification
- Kingdom: Animalia
- Phylum: Platyhelminthes
- Class: Monogenea
- Order: Dactylogyridea
- Family: Diplectanidae
- Genus: Pseudorhabdosynochus
- Species: P. dionysos

Binomial name
- Pseudorhabdosynochus dionysos Schoelinck & Justine, 2011

Species of flatworm

Pseudorhabdosynochus dionysos is a species of diplectanid monogenean that is parasitic on the gills of the camouflage grouper Epinephelus polyphekadion. It was described in 2011.

== Description ==
Pseudorhabdosynochus dionysos is a small monogenean, 0.3-0.6 mm in length. The species has the general characteristics of other species of Pseudorhabdosynochus, with a flat body and a posterior haptor, which is the organ by which the monogenean attaches itself to the gill of its host. The haptor bears two squamodiscs, one ventral and one dorsal. The sclerotized male copulatory organ, or "quadriloculate organ", has the shape of a bean with four internal chambers, as in other species of Pseudorhabdosynochus.

The vagina includes a sclerotized part, which is a complex structure.

== Etymology ==
The species Pseudorhabdosynochus dionysos was named after the morphology of its vagina, which has (vaguely) the shape of a glass and resembles that of another species. According to the authors, the specific epithet, dionysos, is the Greek name for the Latin Bacchus, the mythological God of wine, by analogy with the similar species Pseudorhabdosynochus bacchus Sigura, Chauvet & Justine, 2007.

== Hosts and localities ==
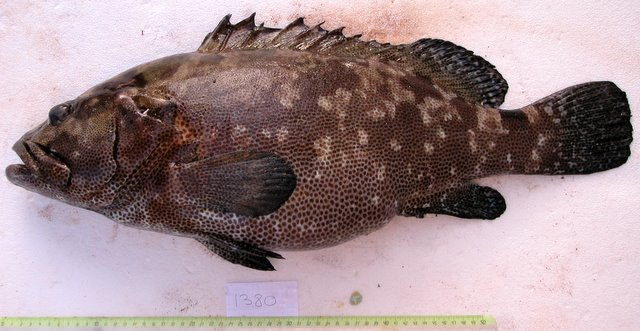
The camouflage grouper Epinephelus polyphekadion is the type-host of P. dionysos; the photograph shows a specimen from New Caledonia.

The type-host and only recorded host of P. dionysos is the camouflage grouper Epinephelus polyphekadion. The type-locality and only recorded locality is the barrier reef off Nouméa, New Caledonia.

The camouflage grouper harbours three other species of Pseudorhabdosynochus, namely Pseudorhabdosynochus crassus, Pseudorhabdosynochus viscosus and Pseudorhabdosynochus huitoe.
