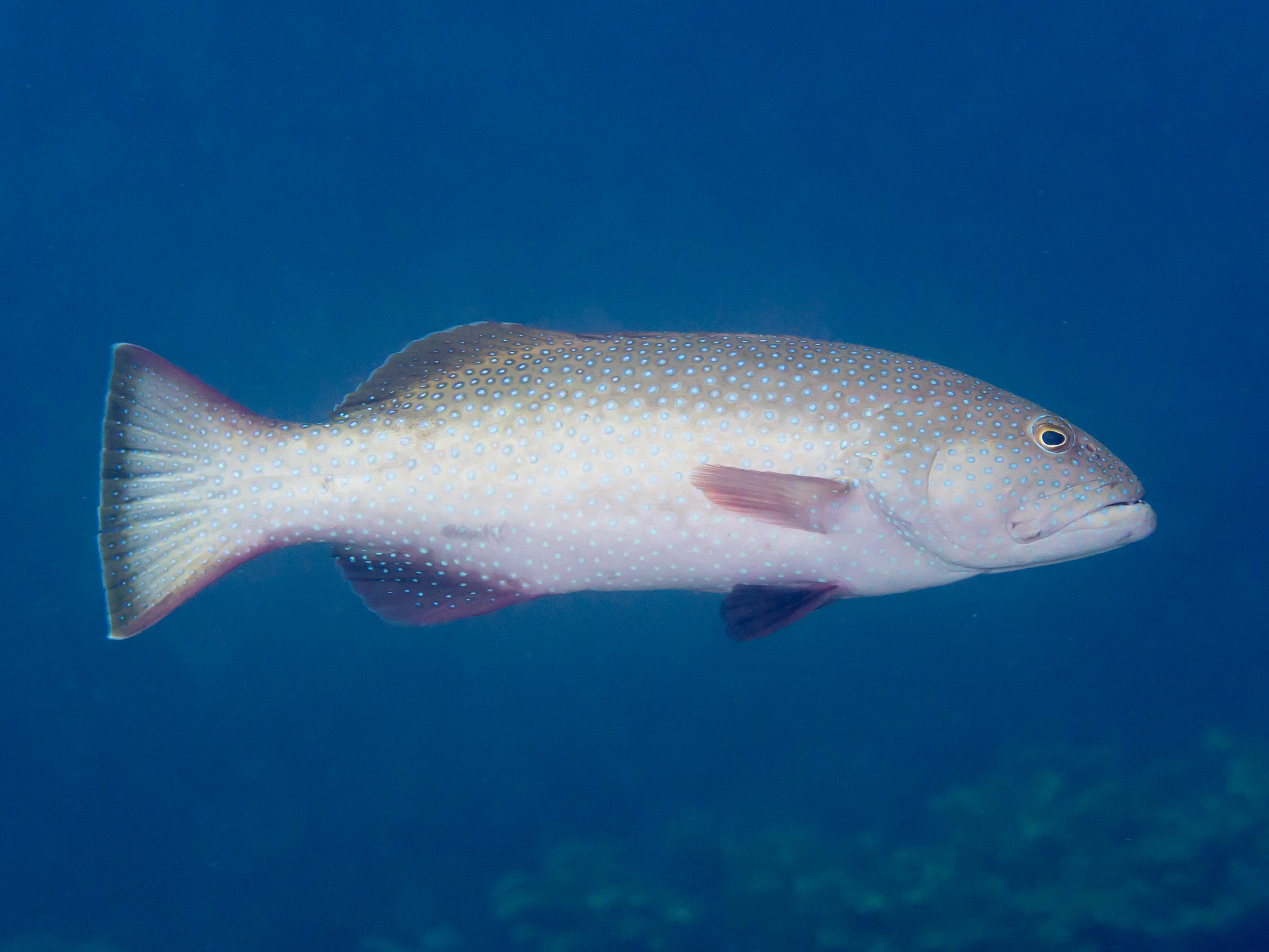

Conservation status
- Vulnerable (IUCN 3.1)

Scientific classification
- Kingdom: Animalia
- Phylum: Chordata
- Class: Actinopterygii
- Division: Teleostei
- Order: Perciformes
- Family: Epinephelidae
- Genus: Plectropomus
- Species: P. areolatus

Binomial name
- Plectropomus areolatus Rüppell, 1830

Synonyms
- List: Plectropoma areolatum Rüppell, 1830; Plectropomus areolatum Rüppell, 1830; Plectropomus trancatus Fowler & Bean, 1930; Plectropomus truncatus Fowler & Bean, 1930

= Squaretail coral grouper =

Species of fish

The squaretail coral grouper (Plectropomus areolatus) is a species of marine ray-finned fish. It is a grouper from the subfamily Epinephelinae, which is part of the family Serranidae. This family also includes anthias and sea basses. The squaretail coral grouper is also known as the spotted coral trout or the squaretail coral trout, and is fast-growing, short-lived, and early-maturing. However, due to the continued decrease in its population, it is now classified as vulnerable, as it continues to face threats from human activity.

== Description ==
The squaretail coral grouper has a long body. At first maturity, it is around 36.65 cm long and weighs around 771.2 grams, but it can grow to a maximum length of 80 cm, with the female fish usually larger in length. It is characterized by having 7 to 8 dorsal spines and 10 to 12 soft rays, while the anal fin has 3 spines and 8 soft rays. It has 1 to 4 canines on the upper jaw. The caudal fin (tail) is truncated, ending in a vertical edge, which gives this fish its name. There are also a variety of possible colors that the squaretail coral grouper can exhibit, ranging from a whitish gray color with dark spots to a greenish-gray or a red and brown pattern. Its fins are dark brown in color.

== Distribution and habitat ==
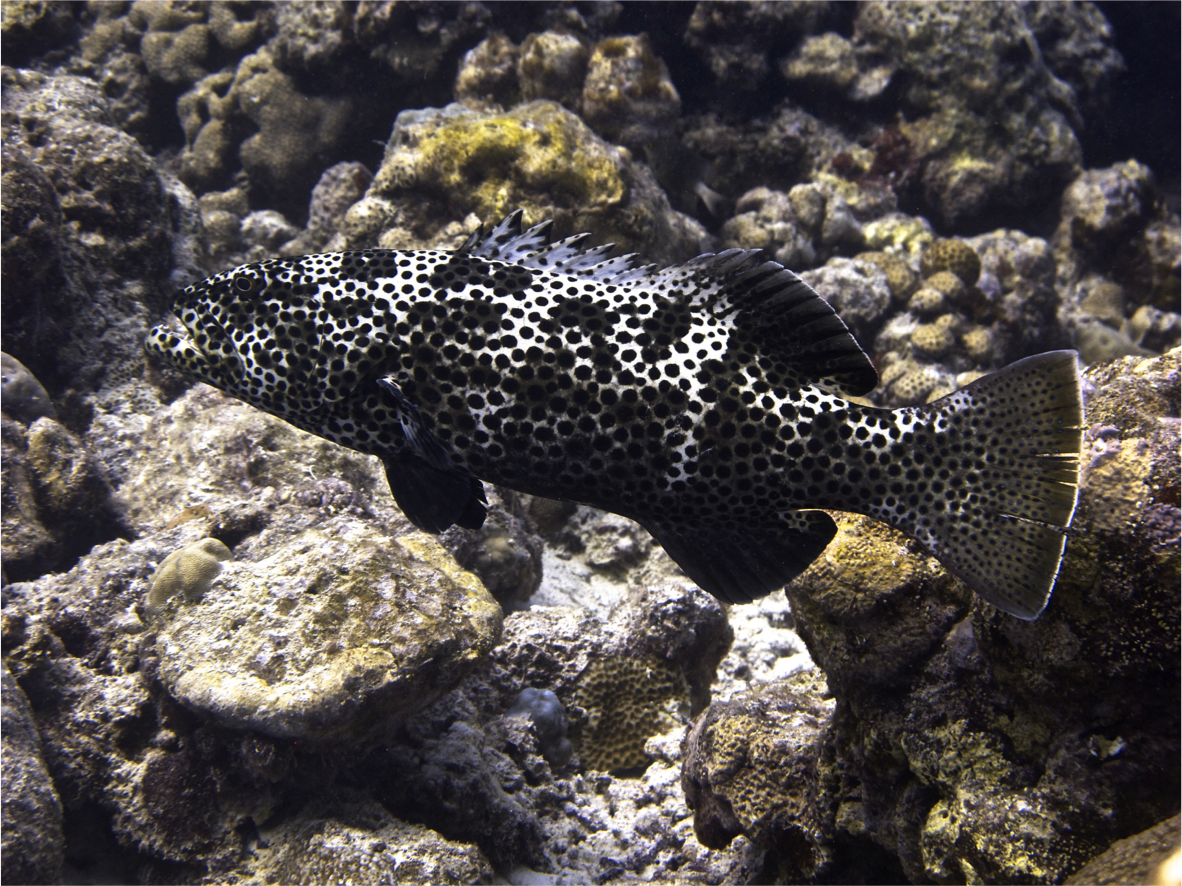
At Lakshadweep (India)

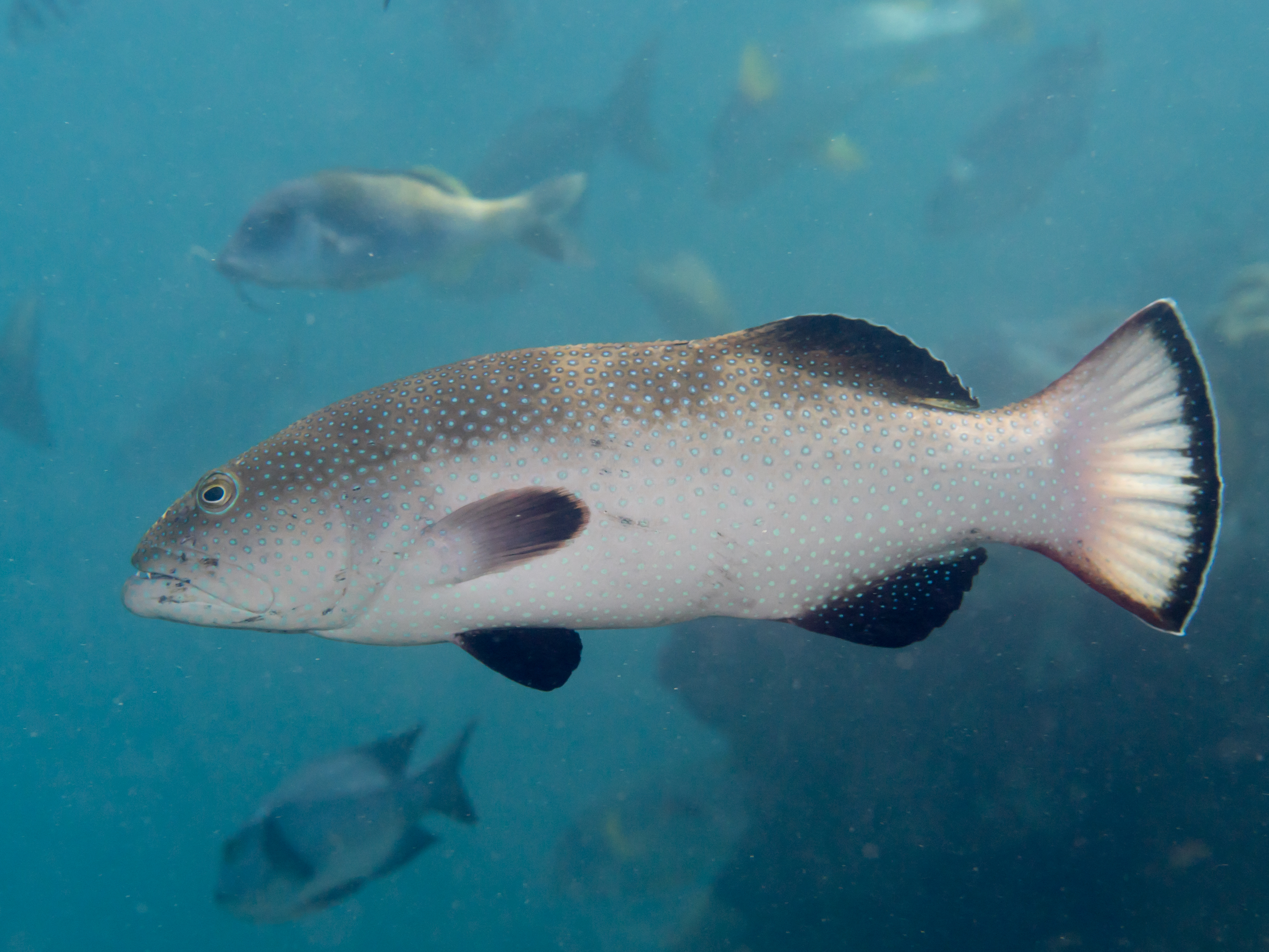
In Indonesia

The squaretail coral grouper is commonly found in the western Pacific, including the waters around Japan, southeastern China, the Philippines, Indonesia, and Australia. It is also found in the Indian Ocean, near East Africa.

Squaretail coral groupers live in shallow lagoonal and seaward coral-rich areas, especially in channels at the reef front. They are often widely distributed in coral reefs or rocky reefs in tropical and subtropical waters. They typically live in depths ranging from 1 to 70 m (3 ft 3 in to 229 ft 8 in) in the marine neritic, the nearshore marine environment that reaches depths of 200m along the continental shelf.

Squaretail coral groupers have small home ranges and many stay close to their aggregation site, with the larvae dispersing within a 14.4 km radius. Their aggregation sites occur relatively close to one another. Out of 32 of the grouper aggregations studied, it was found that 59% of the fish originated where other grouper species aggregated, and 41% formed single-species aggregations. The squaretail coral grouper often co-aggregate with camouflage and brown-marbled groupers, but they also have sites specifically for their species. At some such single-species aggregation sites, the squaretail coral groupers aggregate on reef habitats of low relief that seem to be unable to support the aggregations of these other species.

== Reproduction ==
The peak spawning season of the squaretail coral grouper is from January to April for 2 to 3 months. The spawning times occur during new and full moons, which may suggest a linkage to associated high tidal variation and flow to enhance dispersal or retention. Thus, similar to temperature, specific lunar periodicity lacks dependability as an indicator of spawning times and demonstrates the variability within the species for reproduction relative to lunar periodicity. While some regional similarities exist, temperature profiles cannot be used reliably as an indicator of spawning in these species, because the temperature profiles during reproductive periods vary.

Grouper aggregations occur monthly around the year and form with the purpose to spawn, as seen by a change in color, as well as fighting, quivering, and multiple gravid females. When spawning, males typically arrive individually or in small groups to establish territory and arrive earlier than females do. The females often come in large schools.

== Diet ==
The squaretail coral grouper is mainly a piscivore, meaning it eats other fish. It hunts like other groupers do, by creating a suction that pulls fish into its mouth and most often hunts alone.

== Life cycle ==
The squaretail coral grouper matures at around 2.8 years and has a lifespan of around 10 years. After hatching from an egg, it starts off as planktonic larvae before maturing into a fish.

There is some evidence of the changing of sex, or protogynous hermaphroditism. Evidence of this is seen in gonad tissue that may contain the male and female sexual organs: testes and ovaries. One previous study found 18 out of the 448 samples to transition from female to male. Upon following up on the study, potential errors were found, thus leaving this theory unresolved.

== Human impact ==
Humans are the main threat to the squaretail coral grouper. The squaretail coral grouper is a highly sought out fish in the food industry, with its consumption most common in southern China. Squaretail coral groupers have a slow maturation and long life span, meaning that they cannot easily replenish their population when overfished. Overfishing is the leading cause of these groupers' vulnerable status, especially when the spawning sites are targeted. They are one of the most common members of the Plectropomus genus to be sold in restaurants.

Squaretail coral groupers are considered artisanal fish and are among the top most desired and in-demand fish species in the fish trade industry of Hong Kong and are sold at high value. Most fishers target them by nighttime via spearfishing or hook and line fishing since the fish stay in accessible shallow reef areas. Squaretail coral groupers are more abundant and physically larger than the other fish in their aggregation sites, leading them to be more commonly hunted. In addition, they are often inactive at night, and thus easy to spear. Declines in the population at specific sites were often attributed to human population growth or the increased pressure as other reef fish resources became scarcer, leading the squaretail coral grouper to be targeted more.

At one aggregation site, night spearfishing seemingly overfished an aggregation of several grouper species to the point of economic extinction. To protect squaretail coral groupers, sales of the fish are limited and there are catch bans during the reproductive seasons. There was a decrease in fishing from 1999 to 2000, but there still was an unsustainably large volume of imported fish. For the fish that exist in protected areas and are not threatened by the fishing industry, they are still affected by climate disturbances.

== Risks of human consumption ==
There have been incidences of ciguatera from eating squaretail coral grouper, which is an illness caused by a toxin produced by a microalgae dinoflagellate called Gambierdiscus toxicus. From 1997 to 2006, 2 cases were reported in Okinawa, Japan. The squaretail coral grouper can also carry the parasite Anisakis typica, a type of worm that can live in fish. Eating undercooked or raw fish with Anisakis typica can lead to cases of anisakiasis, a parasitic disease that can result in abdominal pain and fevers.
