= Pseudorhabdosynochus viscosus =

Scientific classification
- Kingdom: Animalia
- Phylum: Platyhelminthes
- Class: Monogenea
- Order: Dactylogyridea
- Family: Diplectanidae
- Genus: Pseudorhabdosynochus
- Species: P. viscosus

Binomial name
- Pseudorhabdosynochus viscosus Schoelinck & Justine, 2011

Species of flatworm

Pseudorhabdosynochus viscosus is a species of diplectanid monogenean that is parasitic on the gills of the camouflage grouper Epinephelus polyphekadion. It was described in 2011.

== Description ==
Pseudorhabdosynochus viscosus is a relatively small monogenean, 0.6-1.2 mm in length. The species has the general characteristics of other species of Pseudorhabdosynochus, with a flat body and a posterior haptor, which is the organ by which the monogenean attaches itself to the gill of is host. The haptor bears two squamodiscs, one ventral and one dorsal. The sclerotized male copulatory organ, or "quadriloculate organ", has the shape of a bean with four internal chambers, as in other species of Pseudorhabdosynochus.

The vagina includes a sclerotized part, which is a complex structure.

== Etymology ==
The specific epithet of the species, viscosus, Latin for viscous, refers to the abundant mucus produced by the host fish.

== Hosts and localities ==
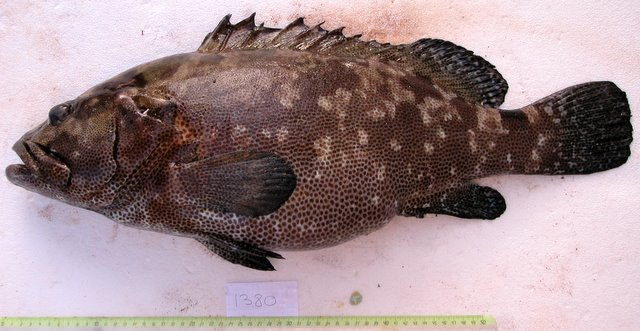
The camouflage grouper Epinephelus polyphekadion is the type-host of P. viscosus; the photograph shows a specimen from New Caledonia.

The type-host and only recorded host of P. viscosus is the camouflage grouper Epinephelus polyphekadion. The type-locality and only recorded locality is the barrier reef off Nouméa, New Caledonia.

The camouflage grouper harbours three other species of Pseudorhabdosynochus, namely Pseudorhabdosynochus crassus, Pseudorhabdosynochus dionysos and Pseudorhabdosynochus huitoe.
