= Red Sea species hazardous to humans =

Although most species in the Red Sea pose no threat to humans, there are a few notable exceptions.

== Biting and wounding fish ==
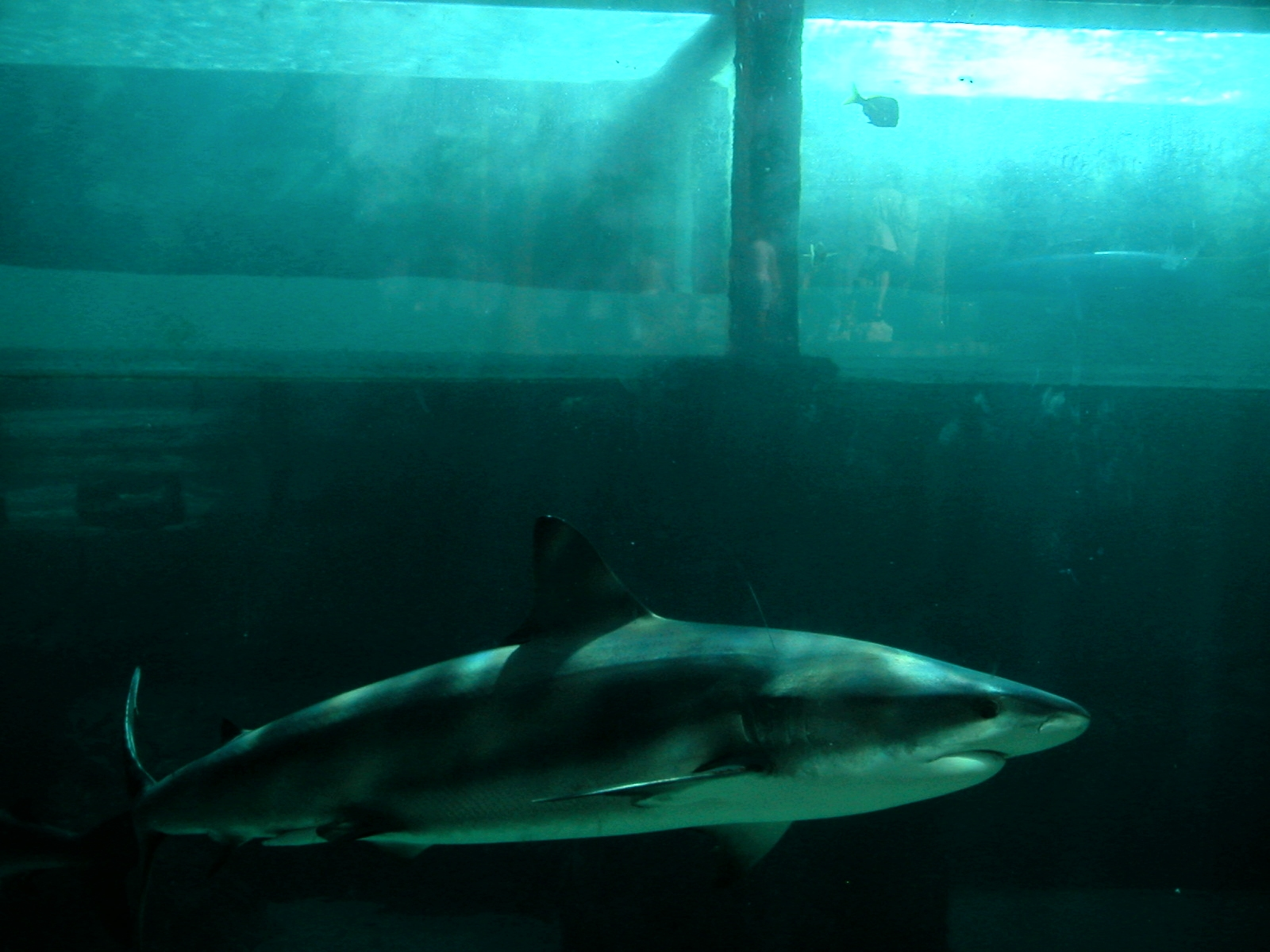
The tiger shark is considered to be one of the most dangerous sharks to humans. Although it is found in the Red Sea it is not usually seen near reefs during the daytime.

The Grey reef shark is territorial and may be aggressive, and has been involved in non-fatal attacks on divers.

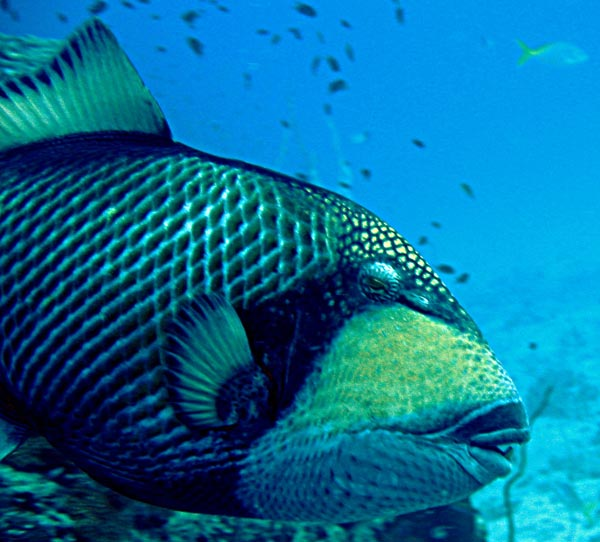
Balistoides viridescens, the Titan triggerfish, will guard its nest aggressively if eggs are present. Attacks can be severe and leave wounds requiring stitches.

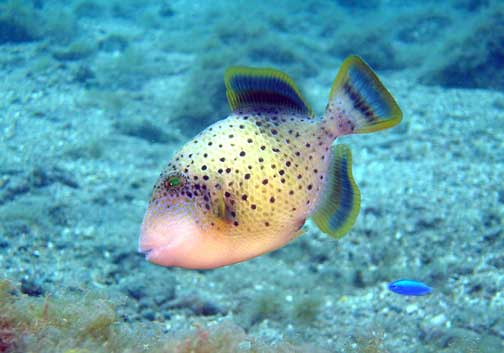
Pseudobalistes flavimarginatus, the Yellowmargin triggerfish, is another large triggerfish and should not be disturbed if tending to eggs.

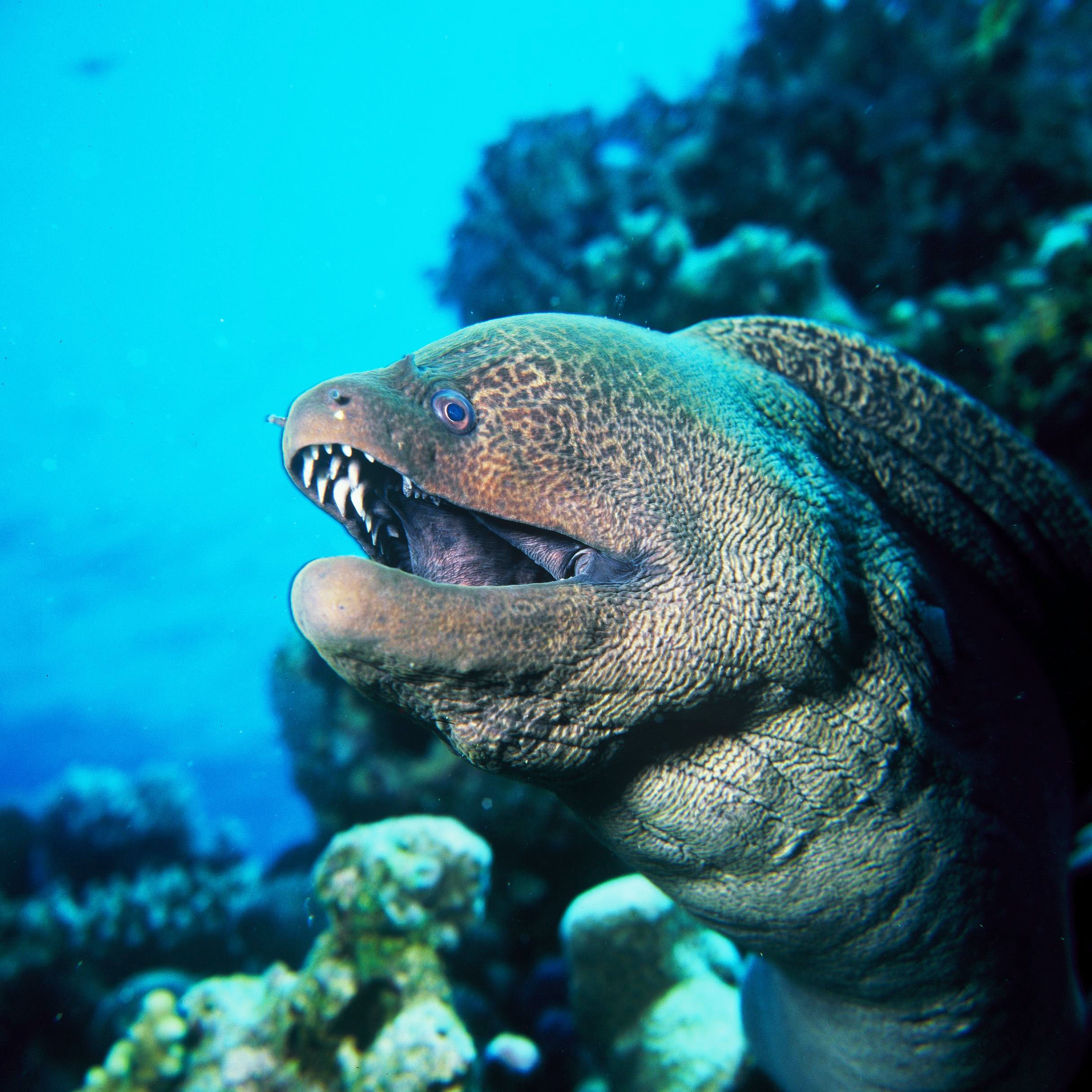
Moray eels such as the Giant moray are only occasionally aggressive; most bites result from divers putting a hand into the hole in which the eel lives.

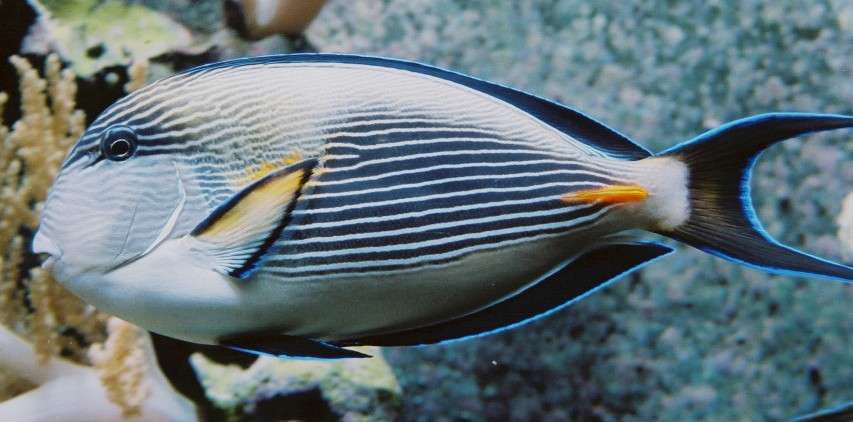
Surgeonfishes have sheathed or fixed blades at the base of the tail which can inflict deep wounds (the yellow stripe on the Sohal tang pictured).

== Stinging and venomous fish ==
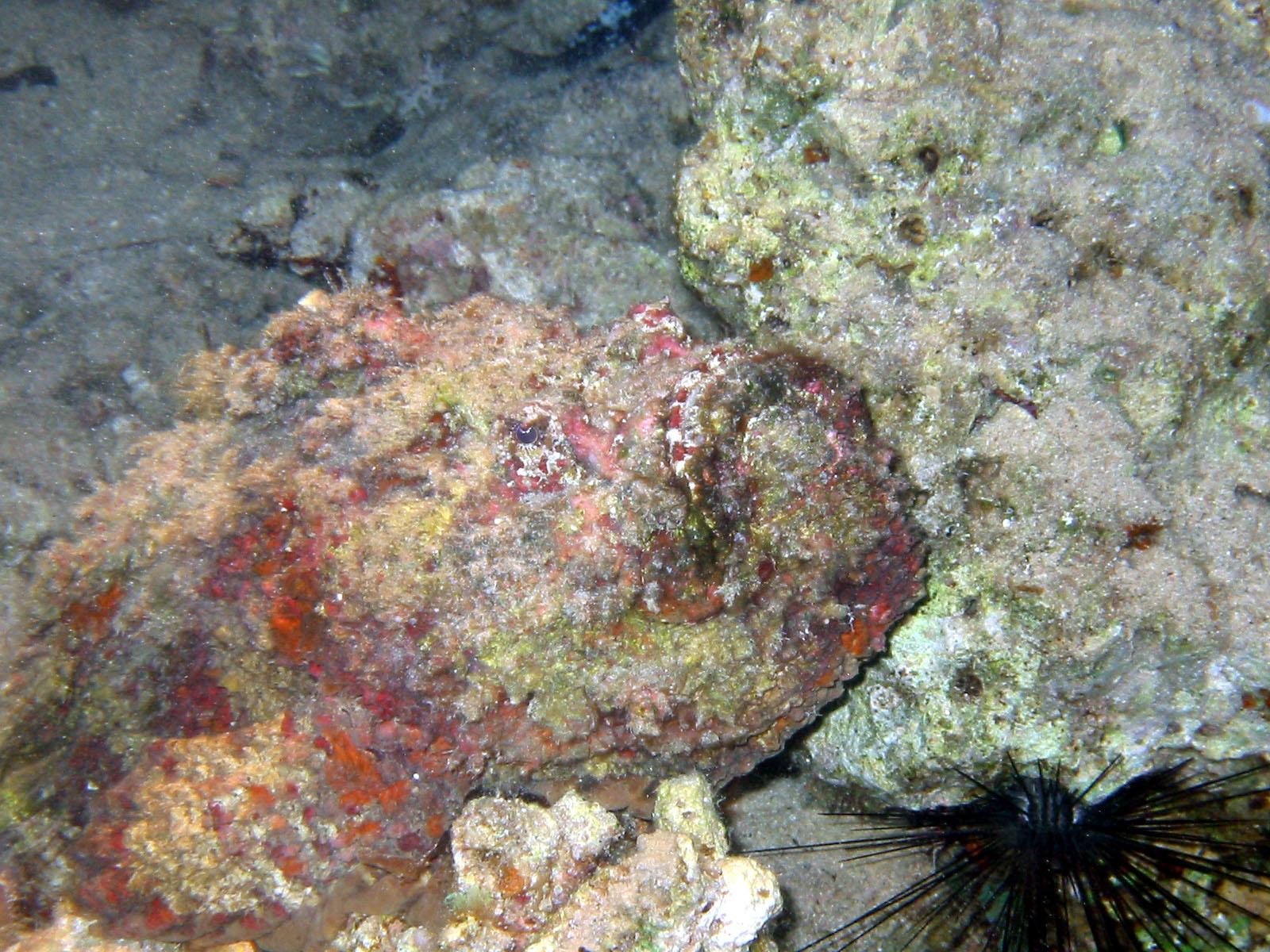
The spines on the back of the Stonefish are venomous and can penetrate a rubber-soled shoe. The fish is extremely well camouflaged and care should be taken to avoid stepping on it. The venom can be fatal.

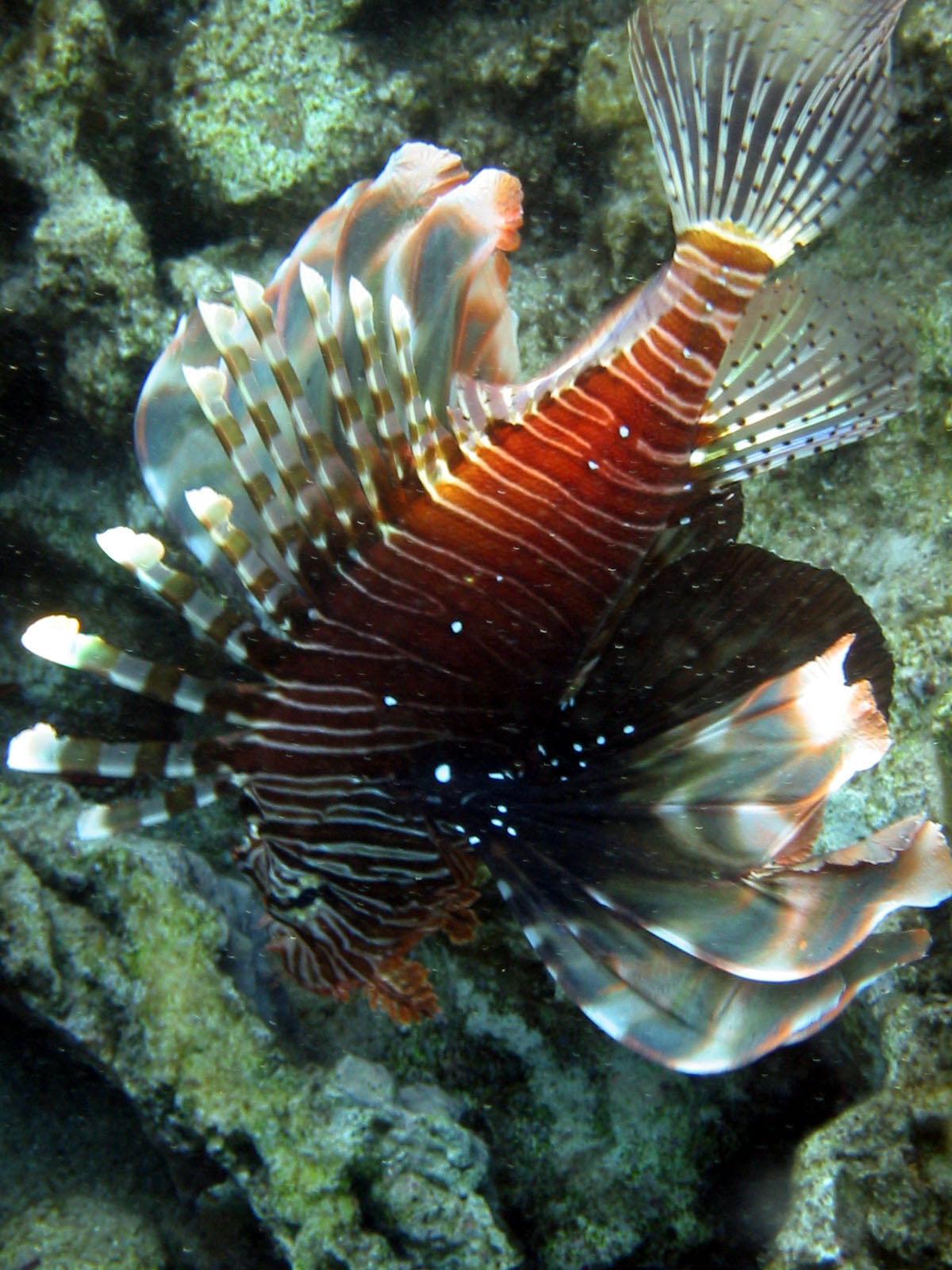
Lionfish such as Pterois miles have stinging spines which rarely inflict a fatal wound but which may be extremely painful.

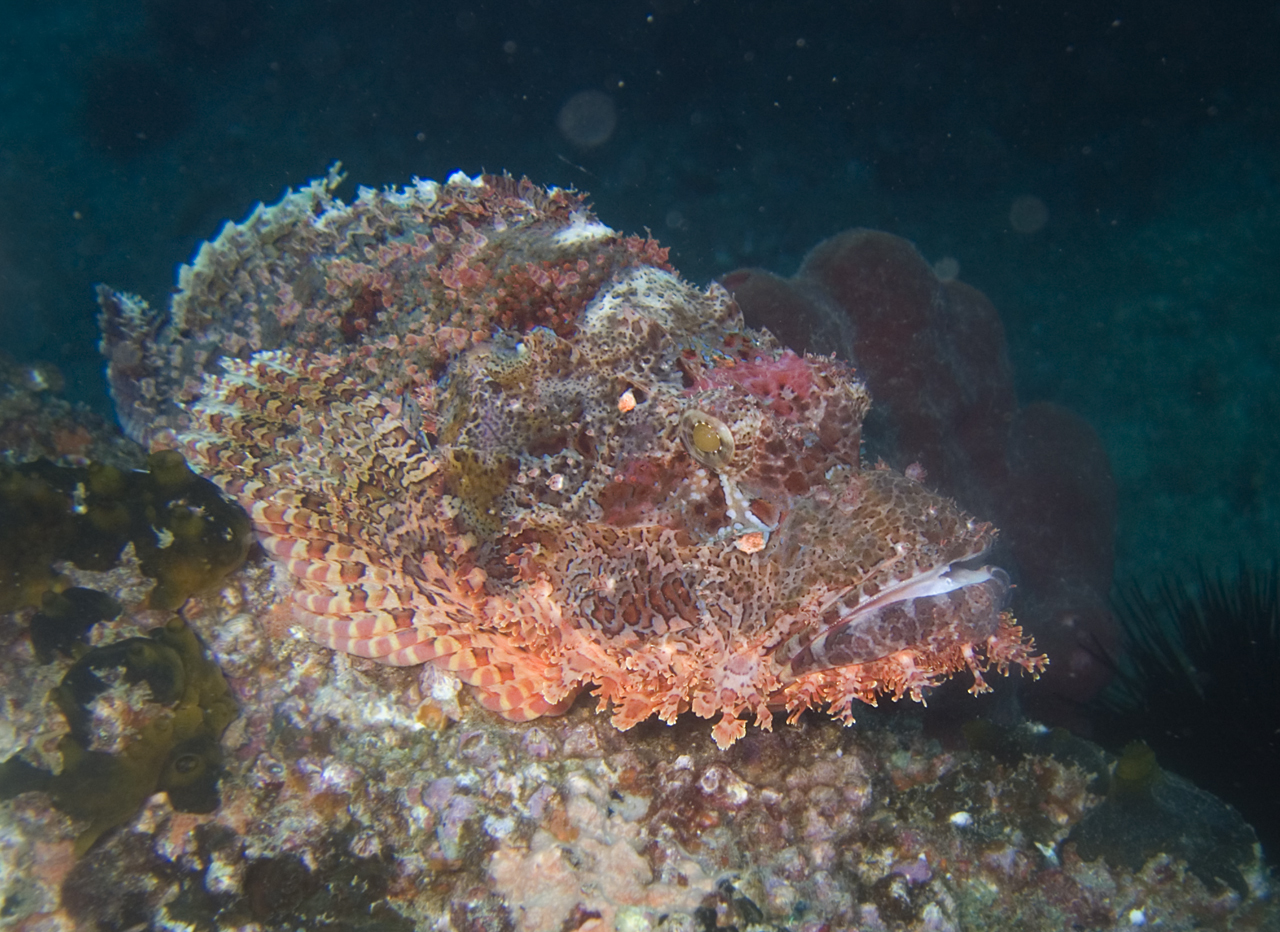
Scorpionfish have venomous spines similar to those of the stonefish, and although the venom is less deadly it may still prove fatal.

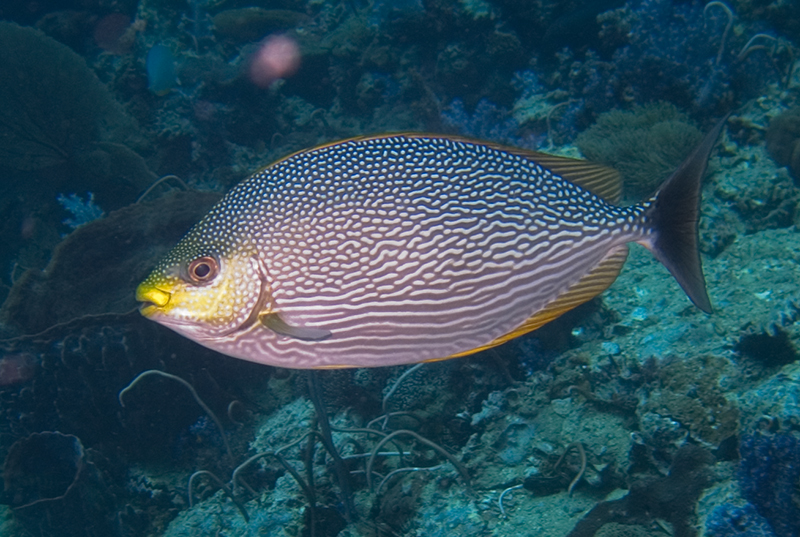
The dorsal, pelvic and anal fins of the Rabbitfishes have venomous spines, capable of inflicting painful wounds.

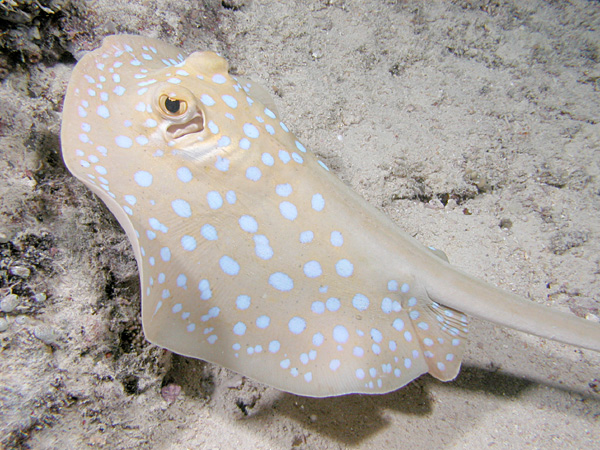
Stingrays have sharp detachable spines at the base of the tail, capable of causing severe wounds. Pictured is the Bluespotted ribbontail ray.

== Poisonous fish ==
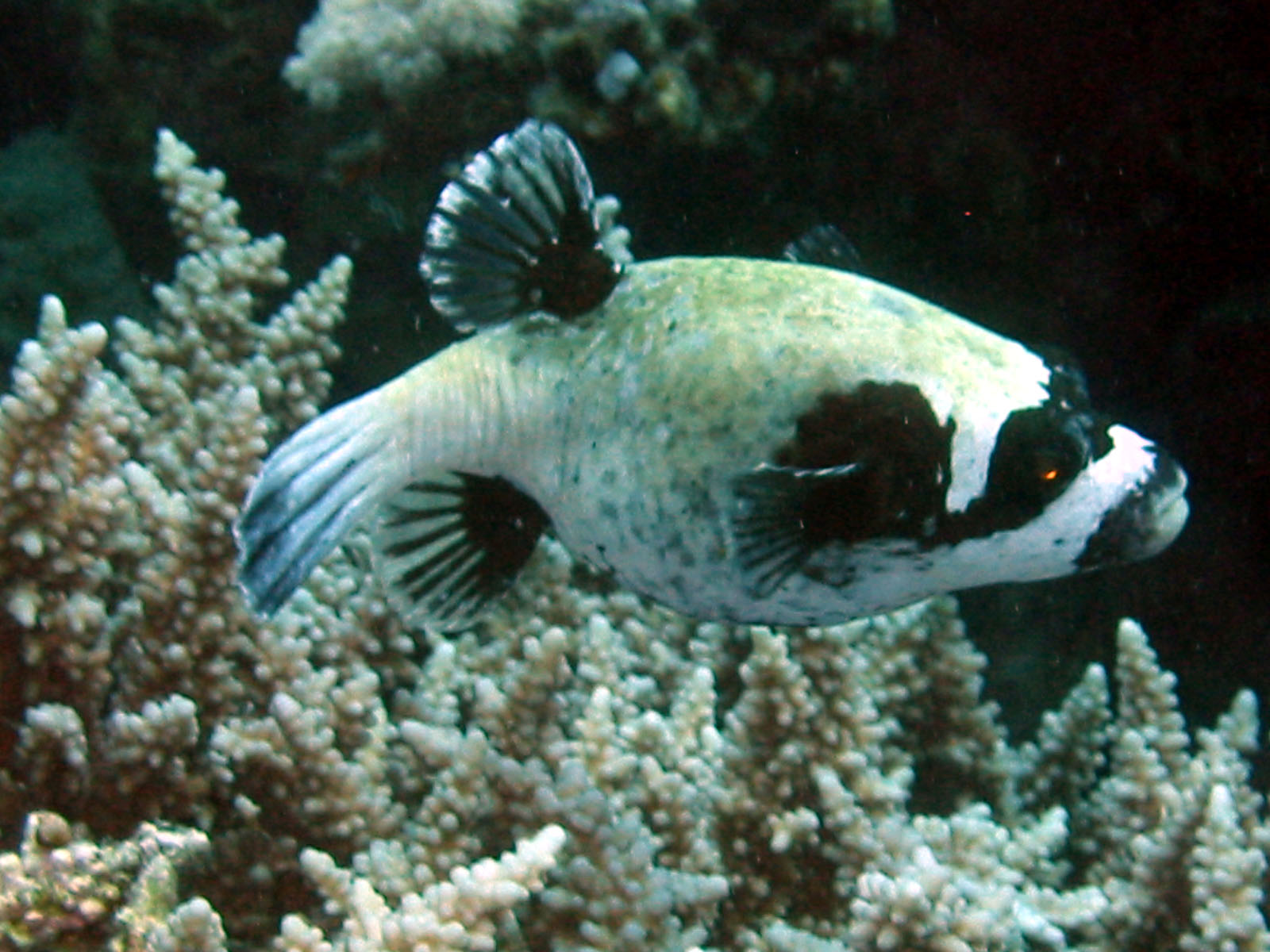
Pufferfish, including this masked puffer accumulate a neurotoxin called tetrodotoxin in their skin and internal organs. This toxin is extremely potent and has been responsible for many fatalities.

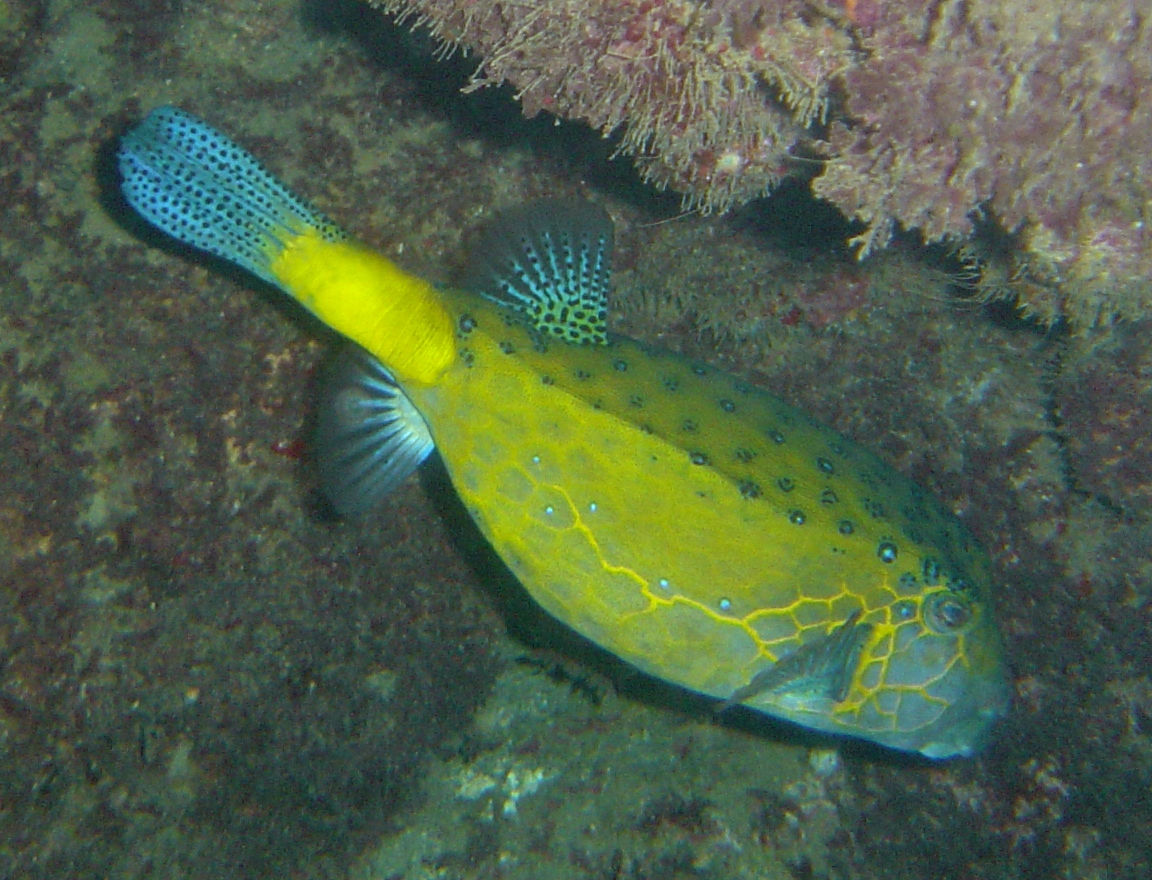
Boxfish also accumulate tetrodotoxin and are poisonous to eat. This is the Yellow boxfish, Ostracion cubicus which is widespread in the Red Sea.

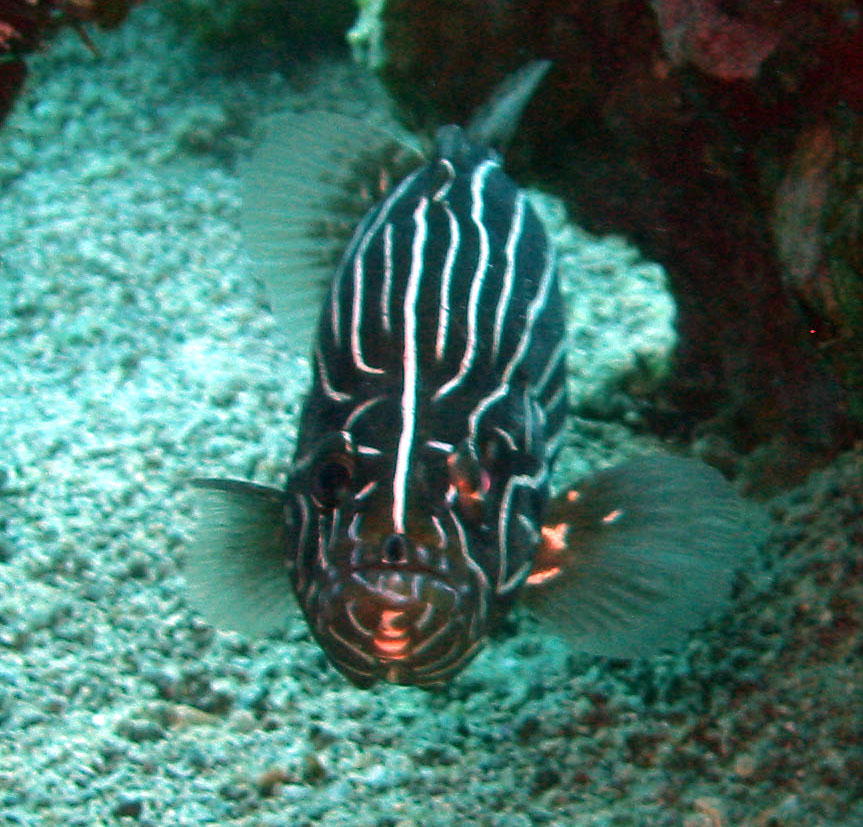
Soapfishes produce the bitter toxin grammistin from their skin to deter predators. This may cause illness in humans.

=== Ciguatera poison ===
Ciguatera poisoning is a danger posed by fish at the top of the food chain, in particular the Twinspot snapper and Giant moray. These fish accumulate a toxin produced by a dinoflagellate which is eaten by their prey species. Ciguatera poisoning can be fatal.

== Invertebrates ==
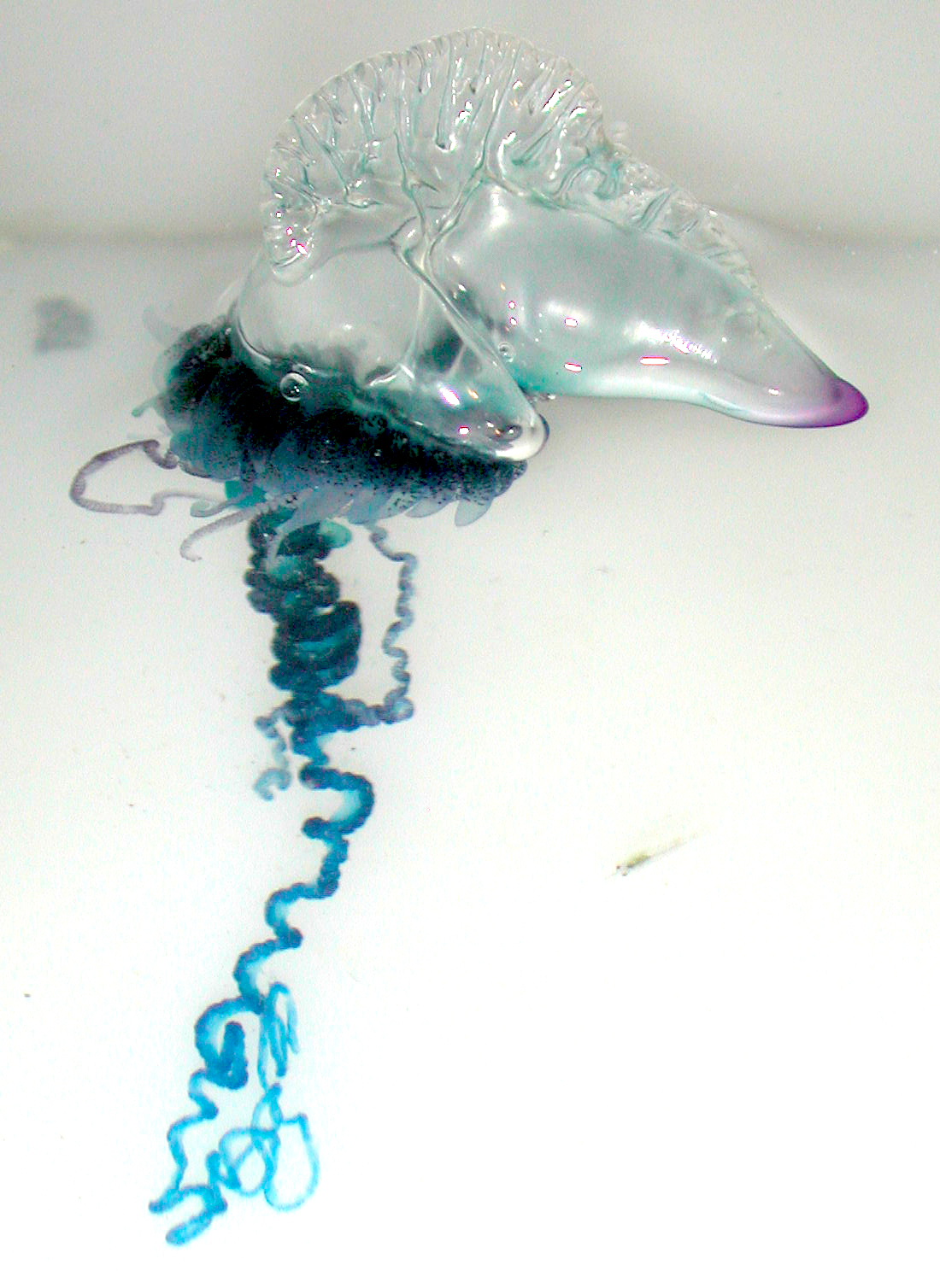
The Portuguese Man o' War is a floating hydrozoan with retractile tentacles which may be several metres long, and which produce extremely painful stings.

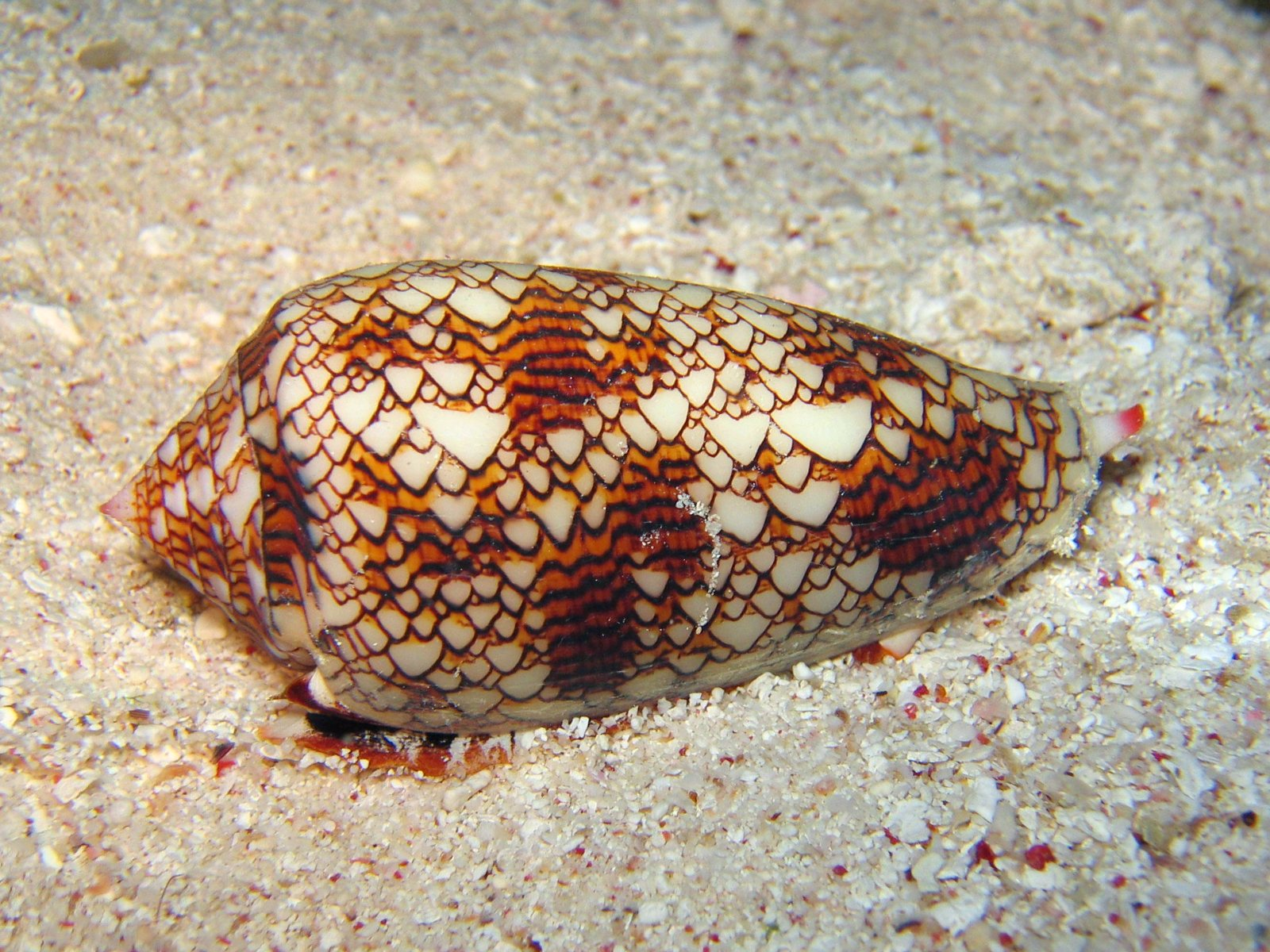
Cone shells house molluscs which use a venomous harpoon to kill their prey. The venom causes paralysis which may lead to death. These shells should not be picked up if there is any chance the organism is still alive.

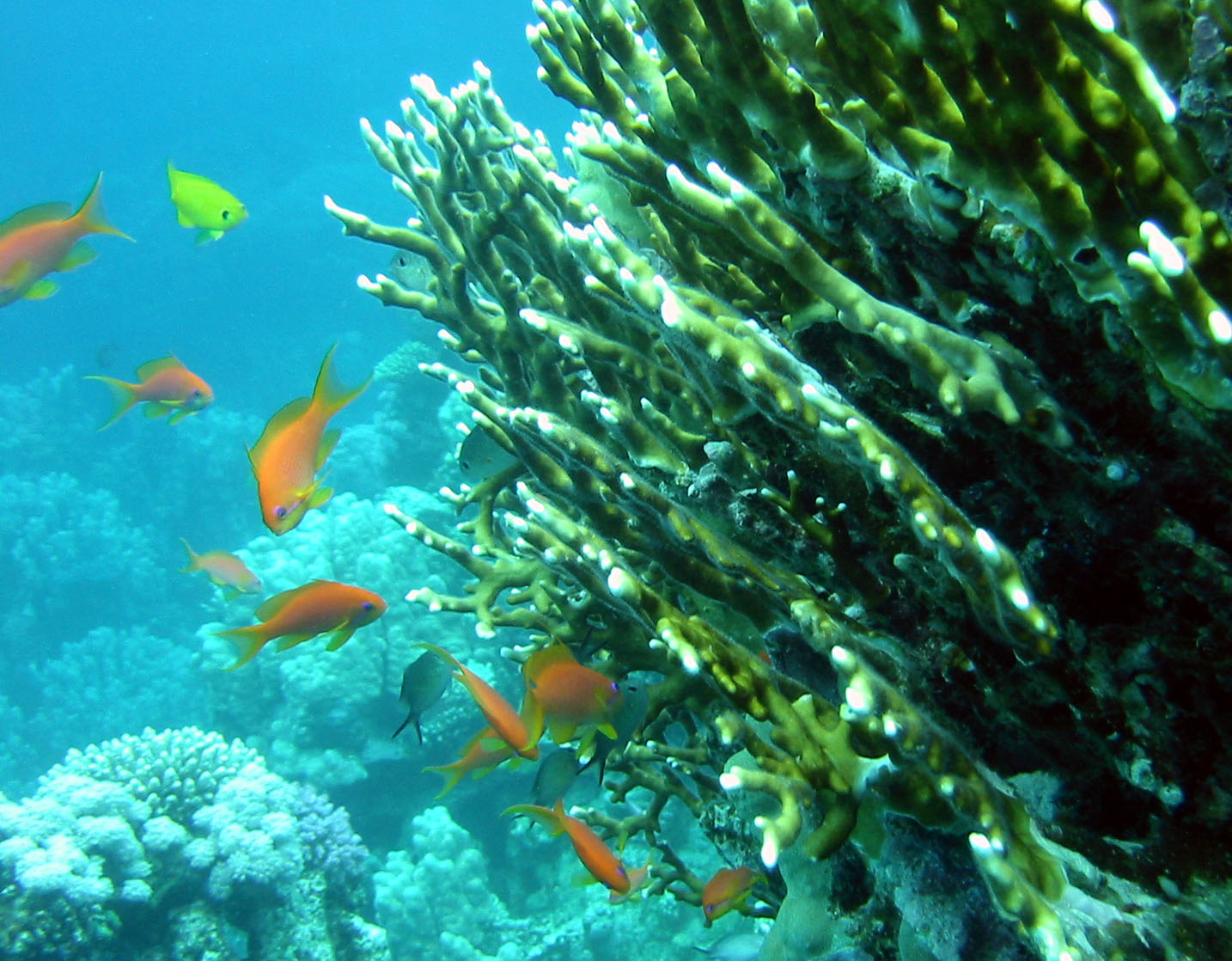
Fire coral, millepora spp is a hydrozoan which has stinging nematocysts on its surface. The chief danger of fire coral is to snorkellers or divers brushing against it.

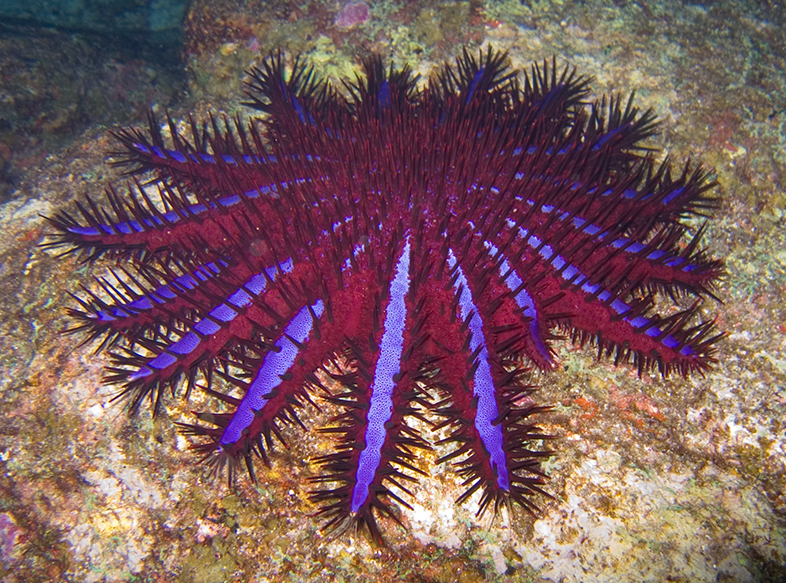
Crown-of-thorns starfishes are covered in spines which have a venomous sheath. The venom may cause highly painful wounds and even paralysis.
