= Roving coral grouper =

Conservation status
- Least Concern (IUCN 3.1)

Scientific classification
- Kingdom: Animalia
- Phylum: Chordata
- Class: Actinopterygii
- Division: Teleostei
- Order: Perciformes
- Suborder: Percoidei
- Family: Epinephelidae
- Genus: Plectropomus
- Species: P. pessuliferus

Binomial name
- Plectropomus pessuliferus (Fowler, 1904)

Synonyms
- Plectropoma pessuliferum Fowler, 1904; Plectropomus marisrubri Randall & Hoese, 1986

Species of fish

The roving coral grouper (Plectropomus pessuliferus), also known as the spotted coral grouper, is a species of marine ray-finned fish, a grouper from the subfamily Epinephelinae which is part of the family Serranidae, which also includes the anthias and sea basses. It is found in the Indo-Pacific, although the Red Sea taxon, P. marisrubri, is regarded as a separate species by some authorities.

== Description ==
The roving coral grouper has a body which is elongate and robust, with the standard length being 2.9 to 3.9 times the depth of the body. The preopercle is mostly rounded, with three large, downward pointing spines along the bottom half. The gill cover has two skin covered spines on either side of a naked central spine. The dorsal fin contains 7–8 spines and 10–12 soft rays while the anal fin contains 3 spines and 8 soft rays. The spiny part of the dorsal fin has a shorter base than the soft-rayed part. The caudal fin is a truncate in adults and emarginate in juveniles. The head, body, and fins are coloured brown to orange-red, with many small blue spots each with dark edges, some of these spots on thehead and flanks are elongated, normally vertically, with much less spotting on the lower body. There is often a blue ring around the eye, although this may be broken. This species attains a total length of 120 centimetres (47 in).

== Distribution ==
The roving coral grouper is a widespread but quite rare species can be found in the Indo-Pacific, from the Red Sea, south along the East African coast to Mozambique and Madagascar and east across the Indian Ocean to the Coral Triangle of the Western Pacific Ocean.

== Habitat and biology ==
These fishes live in coral reef, in shallow lagoon and seaward reefs, at a depth range of 25–147 m. This carnivorous species mainly feed on fishes and crustaceans. They sometimes engage in cooperative hunting with the giant moray (Gymnothorax javanicus), the humphead wrasse (Cheilinus undulatus), or the big blue octopus (Octopus cyanea).

== Taxonomy ==
The roving coral grouper was first formally described as Plectropoma pessuliferum by the American ichthyologist Henry Weed Fowler (1878–1965) with the type locality given as Padang in Sumatra.

Plectropomus marisrubri is now recognized as a distinct species, although it was historically as a subspecies of P. pessuliferus, P. p. maristrubri. Phylogenetic analyses showed that P. pessuliferus, which is a relatively small species and has with a distribution from the central Indian ocean to the Coral Triangle, is the sister species of the Leopard coral grouper (P. leopardus) and is not the closest relative of the Red Sea taxon, P. marisrubri.

== Utilisation ==
The roving coral grouper is caught using spear, hand lines, gill nets and traps. In the Maldives, it is exported to southeast Asia for sale in the live reef fish trade and it is considered to be of high value.
