= Plectropomus maculatus =

- In Thailand

Scientific classification
- Kingdom: Animalia
- Phylum: Chordata
- Class: Actinopterygii
- Division: Teleostei
- Order: Perciformes
- Family: Epinephelidae
- Genus: Plectropomus
- Species: P. maculatus

Binomial name
- Plectropomus maculatus (Bloch, 1790)

Synonyms
- Bodianus maculatus Bloch, 1790; Plectropoma maculatum (Bloch, 1790); Plectropomus maculates (Bloch, 1790)

Species of fish

Plectropomus maculatus, also known as spotted coral grouper, Barcheek coral trout or Coastal coral trout, is one of eight species from the genus Plectropomus.

They are found in the Western Pacific, including Thailand, Singapore, Philippines, Indonesia, Papua New Guinea, the Arafura Sea, Solomon Islands, and Australia. They are often found on nearshore, coastal reefs in depths of 3 to 30 metres (10 to 98 ft).

Plectropomus maculatus can be red, pale grey or olive to dark brown with numerous small blue elongate spots on the head, body and fins. They have been reported to 125 cm (49 in) but scientific record is 85 cm (33 in) and 9.7 kg (21 lb) for a fish captured by a spearfisher at Moreton Island, Queensland in 2017 and a 6.4 kg (14 lb) captured by a line fisher at Broadhurst Reef in 1987.

Plectropomus maculatus are prone to greater physiological stress responses in shallow aquarium waters than Plectropomus leopardus. The former displayed higher levels of cortisol, glucose, lactate, hemoglobin, and hematocrit than the latter; lactate concentration (responsible for muscle movement) in Plectropomus maculatus was especially heightened when they were thrashing. Juvenile Plectropomus maculatus primarily feed on crustaceans, but recent environmental degradation has caused a dietary shift, forcing them to rely more on less-preferred prey fish due to reduced crustacean availability.

== Gallery ==
In Queensland

In Western Australia

For sale in Indonesia

== Sources ==
- Frisch, A., & Anderson, T. (2005). Physiological stress responses of two species of coral trout (Plectropomus leopardus and Plectropomus maculatus). Comparative Biochemistry and Physiology Part a Molecular & Integrative Physiology, 140(3), 317–327. https://doi.org/10.1016/j.cbpb.2005.01.014
