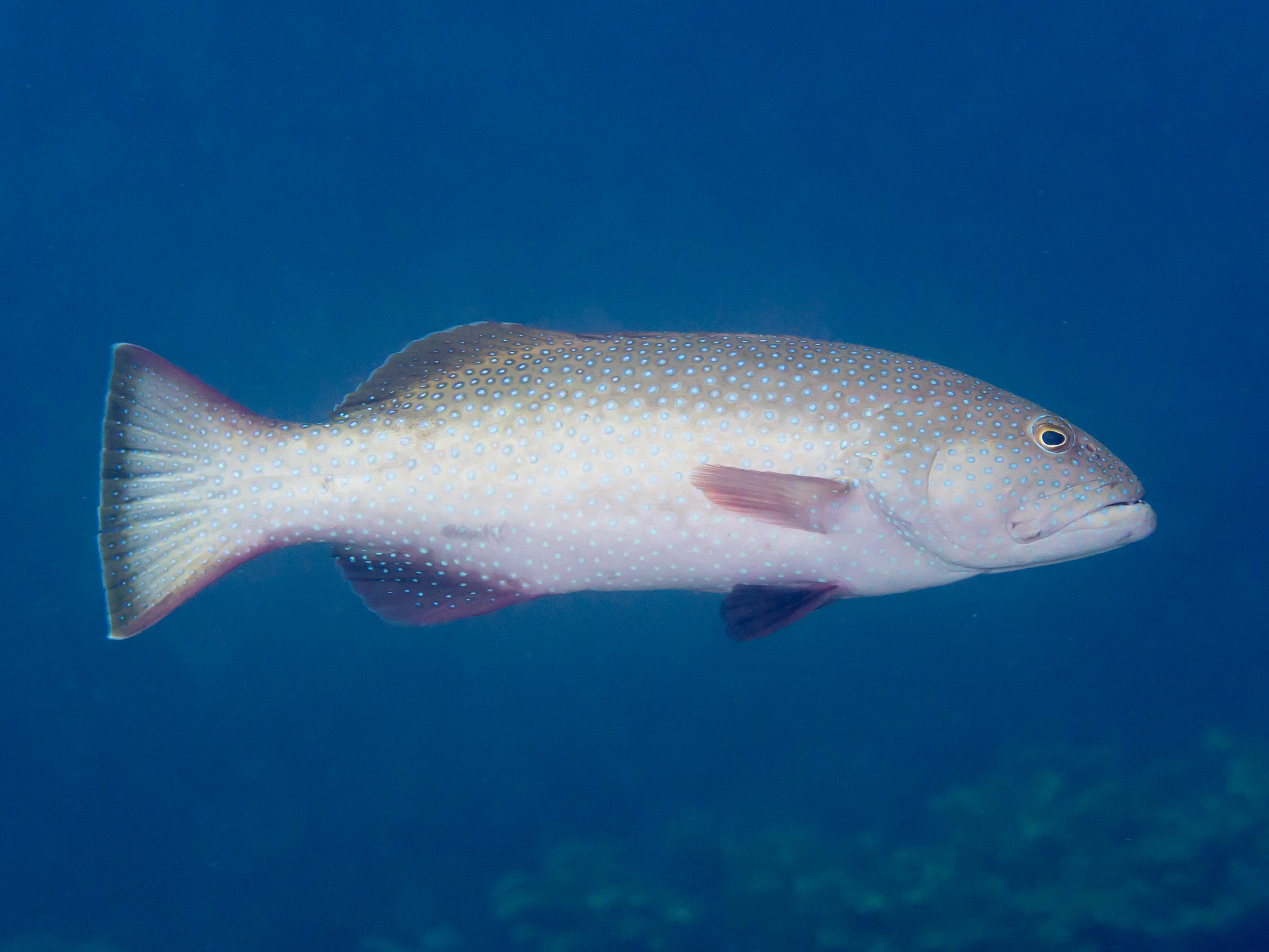
- Plectropomus areolatus

Scientific classification
- Kingdom: Animalia
- Phylum: Chordata
- Class: Actinopterygii
- Division: Teleostei
- Order: Perciformes
- Suborder: Percoidei
- Family: Epinephelidae
- Genus: Plectropomus; Oken, 1817

Type species
- Bodianus maculatus Bloch, 1790

Synonyms
- Paracanthistius Bleeker, 1874; Plectropoma Quoy & Gaimard, 1824; Pleuroperca Fowler & Bean, 1930; Ptertopomus Cuvier, 1820

= Plectropomus =

Genus of fishes

Plectropomus, commonly known as the coral groupers, is a genus of marine ray-finned fish, groupers from the subfamily Epinephelinae, part of the family Serranidae, which also includes the anthias and sea basses. They are found in the Indo-Pacific region.

== Habitat and biology ==
The Plectropomus coral groupers are ecologically similar to the species in the genera Cephalopholis and Mycteroperca, the latter being regarded as the Atlantic and eastern Pacific equivalents of the coral groupers. They are large groupers, with some species attaining total lengths of at least 1 metre (3.3 ft), They prefer shallow tropical and subtropical waters where there are coral reefs and are less sedentary than the groupers in the genera Epinephelus and Cephalopholis. They are predatory species, preying largely on fish.

=== Mimicry ===
Juveniles of many Plectropomus species are mimics of other species. P. laevis mimics the pufferfish Canthigaster valentini, even swimming with its pectoral fins. P. maculatus and P. leopardus are to a lesser degree mimics of Canthigaster papua. P. maculatus may also mimic the monocle bream Scolopsis monogramma.

== Distribution ==
Plectropomus coral groupers are confined to the Indo-Pacific region where they are found from the Red Sea and the east coast of Africa as far south as South Africa and east into the Western Pacific Ocean as far as Polynesia, north to Japan and south to Australia.

== Utilization ==
Plectropomus coral groupers are very important to artisanal fisheries wherever they are found and they are caught using hook and line by spear fishing and trapping, however they are a frequent cause of Ciguatera poisoning among consumers of their flesh.

== Species ==
The following eight species are classified within the genus Plectropomus:

Image	Scientific name	Common name	Distribution
	Plectropomus areolatus (Rüppell, 1830)	squaretail coral grouper	Indo-Pacific: Red Sea to the Phoenix Islands and Samoa, north to Ryukyu Islands, south to Australia.
	Plectropomus laevis (Lacepède, 1801)	black-saddled coral grouper	Indo-Pacific, from East Africa (Kenya, Mozambique) to the central and southern Pacific, eastward to the Tuamotu Island, north to the Ryukyu Islands, south to Australia, Indian Ocean and islands of western and central Pacific
	Plectropomus leopardus (Lacepède, 1802)	leopard coral grouper	Western Pacific
	Plectropomus maculatus (Bloch, 1790)	spotted coral grouper	Western Pacific: Thailand, Singapore, Philippines, Indonesia, Papua New Guinea, the Arafura Sea (Ref. 9819), Solomon Islands, and Australia
	Plectropomus marisrubri Randall & Hoese, 1986	Red Sea coralgrouper	
	Plectropomus oligacanthus (Bleeker, 1854)	highfin coral grouper	Indo-West Pacific: Philippines, Indonesia, New Guinea, northeastern Australia (Cape York to northern Great Barrier Reef) Belau, Truk, Caroline Islands, Marshall Islands, and the Solomon Islands.
	Plectropomus pessuliferus (Fowler, 1904)	roving coral grouper	Indo-Pacific, from the Red Sea to Fiji (Djibouti, Egypt, Eritrea, Indonesia (Bali, Java and Sumatra), Israel, Jordan, Mozambique, Saudi Arabia, Sudan, Tanzania, Tonga, Zanzibar, Maldives, Laccadives, St. Brandon's Shoals, Sri Lanka, Chagos, Nazareth Bank, and Fiji)
	Plectropomus punctatus (Quoy & Gaimard, 1824)	marbled coral grouper	Western Indian Ocean: Kenya to South Africa, Comoros, Madagascar, Aldabra, Seychelles, Mauritius, St. Brandon's Shoals, Nazareth Bank, and the Chagos Archipelago. Unknown from the Red Sea, Persian Gulf, and the Asian coast from Arabia to India.

Other authorities recognise Plectropomus marisrubri, which Fishbase treats as a synonym of P. pessuliferus, as a valid species., while others as treat it as a subspecies of P. pessuliferus, P.p. maristrubri.
