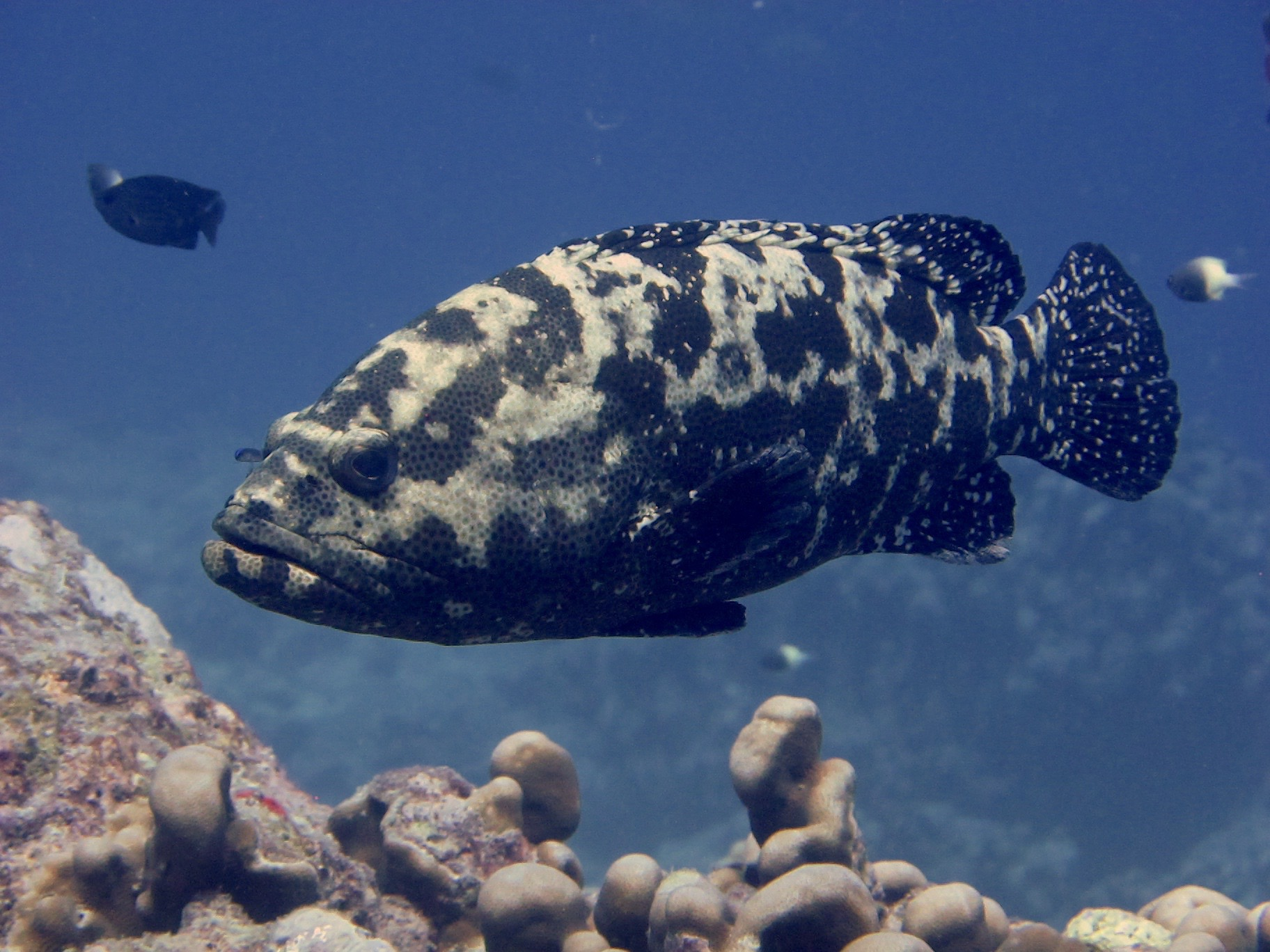

Conservation status
- Vulnerable (IUCN 3.1)

Scientific classification
- Kingdom: Animalia
- Phylum: Chordata
- Class: Actinopterygii
- Order: Perciformes
- Family: Epinephelidae
- Genus: Epinephelus
- Species: E. fuscoguttatus

Binomial name
- Epinephelus fuscoguttatus (Forsskål, 1775)

Synonyms
- Perca summana fuscoguttata Forsskål, 1775; Serranus fuscoguttatus (Forsskål, 1775); Serranus horridus Valenciennes, 1828; Serranus taeniocheirus Valenciennes, 1830; Serranus lutra Valenciennes, 1832; Epinephelus lutra (Valenciennes, 1832)

= Brown-marbled grouper =

Tiger grouper

Species of fish

The brown-marbled grouper or tiger grouper (Epinephelus fuscoguttatus) is a benthic marine fish which belongs to the family Serranidae or also known as the groupers.

== Description ==
Epinephelus fuscoguttatus is a medium-sized fish which grows up to 120 cm, but the average size mostly observed is 50 cm. Its body has a stocky and robust aspect, is compressed laterally, and has a sharp profile for the head. The mouth is big and has a superior position with many small teeth and canines in front. The background coloration is pale yellowish-brown with many dark brown or grey blotches that are irregular in size and shape. The body is also covered with many small, dark brown spots. All the fins are large and round.

The brown-marbled grouper can be easily confused with its close relative Epinephelus polyphekadion. The differences are more obvious in adult specimens. The distinctive characteristics of the brown-marbled grouper are: a small black saddle on the top of the caudal peduncle, when observed on the side a notch above the eyes, and the front head is clearly visible, its body is quite thick from the front of the dorsal fin to the bottom of the fish below the pectoral fins.

== Distribution and habitat ==
It is widely distributed throughout the tropical and subtropical waters of the Indo-Pacific, from the eastern coasts of Africa to the oceanic islands of the centre of the Pacific Ocean, Red Sea included. However, it is absent from the Persian Gulf, Hawaii, and French Polynesia.

Like many of the groupers, the brown-marbled grouper lives in rich clear waters close to coral or rocky reefs, lagoons, and external slopes from the surface until 60 metres (200 ft) depth.

== Feeding ==
The brown-marbled grouper is carnivorous and its diet consists mainly in fishes, crustaceans and cephalopods. It is an ambush predator.

== Behavior ==
This grouper is solitary and sedentary; it defends a well-defined territory, benthic, and is nocturnal, with activity maximal at sunrise and/or at sunset.

It has a quite long life span for a fish and is expected to live until at least 40 years old.

It is a protogynous hermaphrodite, which means the female can evolve into a male during its life.

== Protection ==
The brown-marbled grouper has been listed as "Vulnerable" on the IUCN Red List of Threatened Species since 2004. Because of its size and hardiness, this species has a high commercial interest in the live food fish trade.

However, its biological characteristics make this species particularly vulnerable to over-fishing. Especially during mating periods at specific times and places, the brown-marbled grouper forms spawning aggregations which are easy and attractive targets for fishermen. The long life span of this grouper and its low population density in reefs in the wild result in a weak and slow population regeneration capacity. Furthermore, as fishers prefer to target large fish the brown-marbled groupers are a popular species. That concerns especially males so if the sex ratio between males and females is falling, it will affect the fertilization capacity of the species. It will have the same result on over-fishing female breeders that are highly fertile and would not be able to actively contribute to maintaining the proportion of young in the population.

Brown-marbled groupers can be cultured by hatcheries but these installations' breeding stock is derived from wild-caught fish. Wild capture of breeding stock also has a negative effect on the global population because all the groupers caught in any size category are kept and grown until they reach market size.

As ciguatera toxin is common in brown-marbled groupers' flesh, this limits fishing of this species in some geographic areas.

Over the last few years, some protective measures and/or sustainable fishing methods have been introduced by many states where spawning aggregations are known, for example, Indonesia, Papua New Guinea, Australia, Malaysia, Solomon Islands, and Palau.
