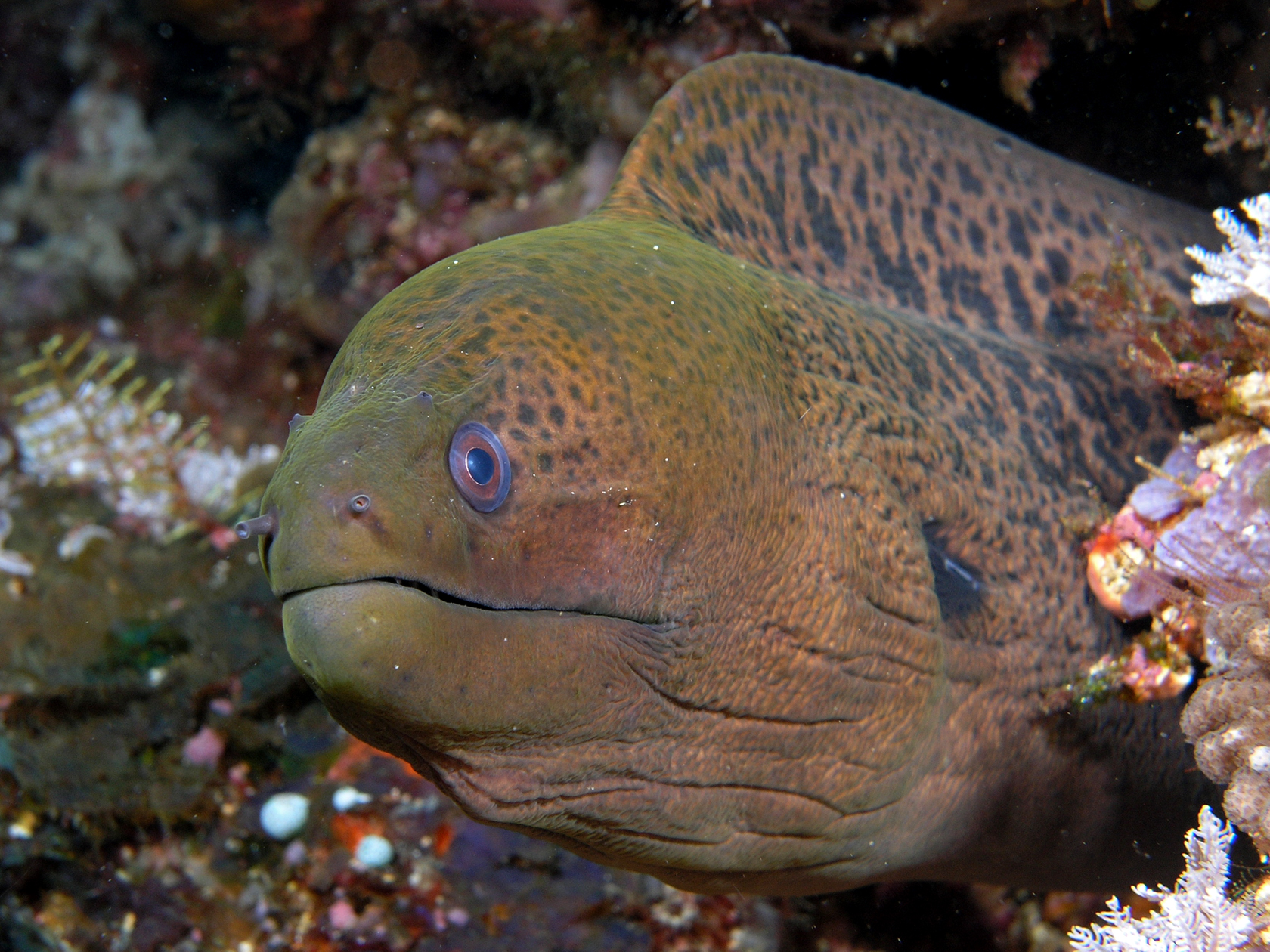

Conservation status
- Least Concern (IUCN 3.1)

Scientific classification
- Kingdom: Animalia
- Phylum: Chordata
- Class: Actinopterygii
- Order: Anguilliformes
- Family: Muraenidae
- Genus: Gymnothorax
- Species: G. javanicus

Binomial name
- Gymnothorax javanicus (Bleeker, 1859)

= Giant moray =

Species of fish

The giant moray (Gymnothorax javanicus) is a species of moray eel and a species of marine fish in the family Muraenidae. In terms of body mass, it is the largest moray eel; however, the slender giant moray is the largest in terms of body length.

== Description ==
As the name suggests, the giant moray is a large eel, reaching up to a little over 3m (10 feet) in length and 30 kg (66 lb) in weight. Its elongated body is brownish in color. While juveniles are tan in color with large black spots, adults have black specks that grade into leopard-like spots behind the head.

== Distribution and habitat ==
The giant moray is widespread in the Indo-Pacific region, being found from eastern coast of Africa, Red Sea included, to the Pitcairn group, Hawaiian Islands and also Polynesia, north to southern Japan and south to New Caledonia, Fiji and the Austral Islands.

It lives in lagoons and on the outer slopes of coral reefs. During the day, it sits sheltered in crevices between 1 and 50 meters deep.

== Biology ==
The giant moray is carnivorous and nocturnal, hunting its prey within the reef. It is known to engage in cooperative hunting with the roving coral grouper (Plectropomus pessuliferus). These two fish species are complementary hunters: While the eel hunts in the reef, it may scare prey up and out of the reef, leaving them to be eaten by the grouper. Similarly, the grouper hunting above the reef may cause prey to attempt to seek refuge in the reef, where the moray may ambush them.

The giant moray mainly feeds on fish and occasionally on crustaceans. This moray eel was recently identified as a natural predator of the lionfish (Pterois miles) in its native habitat in the Red Sea. A mature giant moray has few natural predators, although it may compete for food with reef-dwelling sharks. Cleaner wrasses are commonly found in its presence, cleaning the interior of its mouth.

Gymnothorax javanicus have been shown to have very small optic tectum volumes, indicating that they primarily hunt by smell rather than vision.

== Hazards ==
This species may be hazardous to people. Being at the top of the food chain, it has been known to exhibit biomagnification of harmful ciguatera toxins. Eating a giant moray, especially the liver, can thus cause illness, coma, or even death. While this moray may bite if threatened, cornered or in the presence of food, it is not usually aggressive.

== Gallery ==
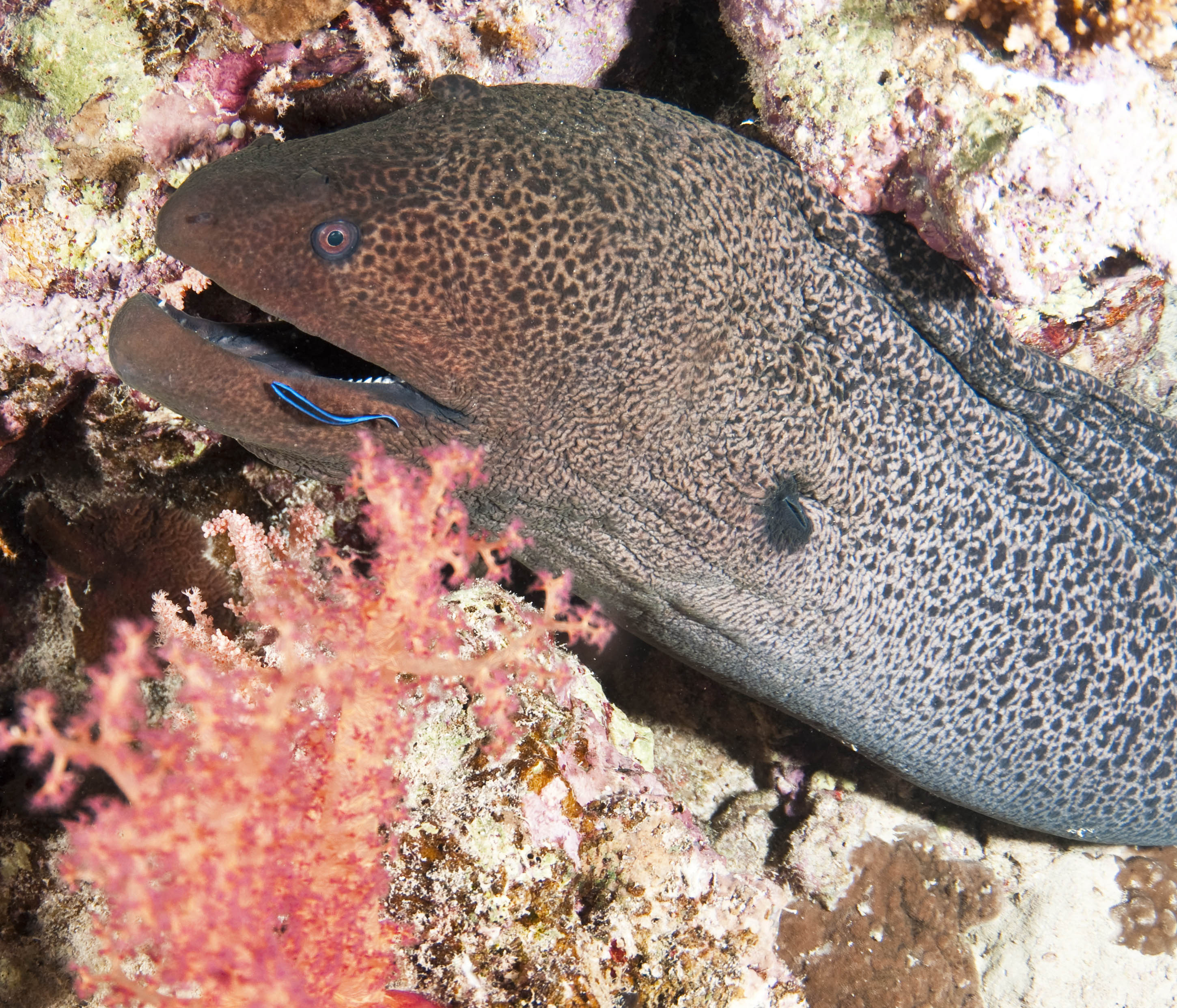
Giant moray with cleaner wrasse

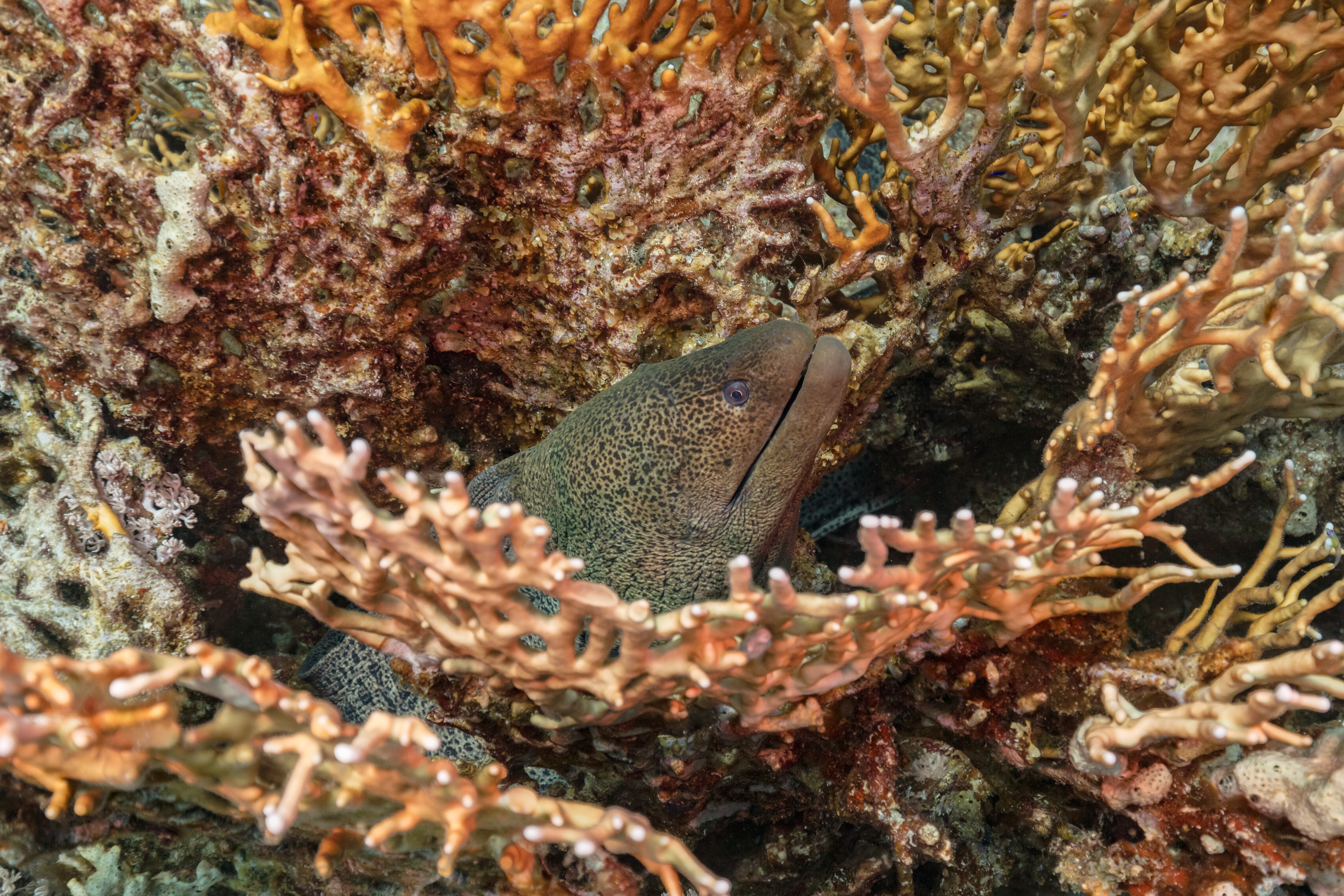
Within coral

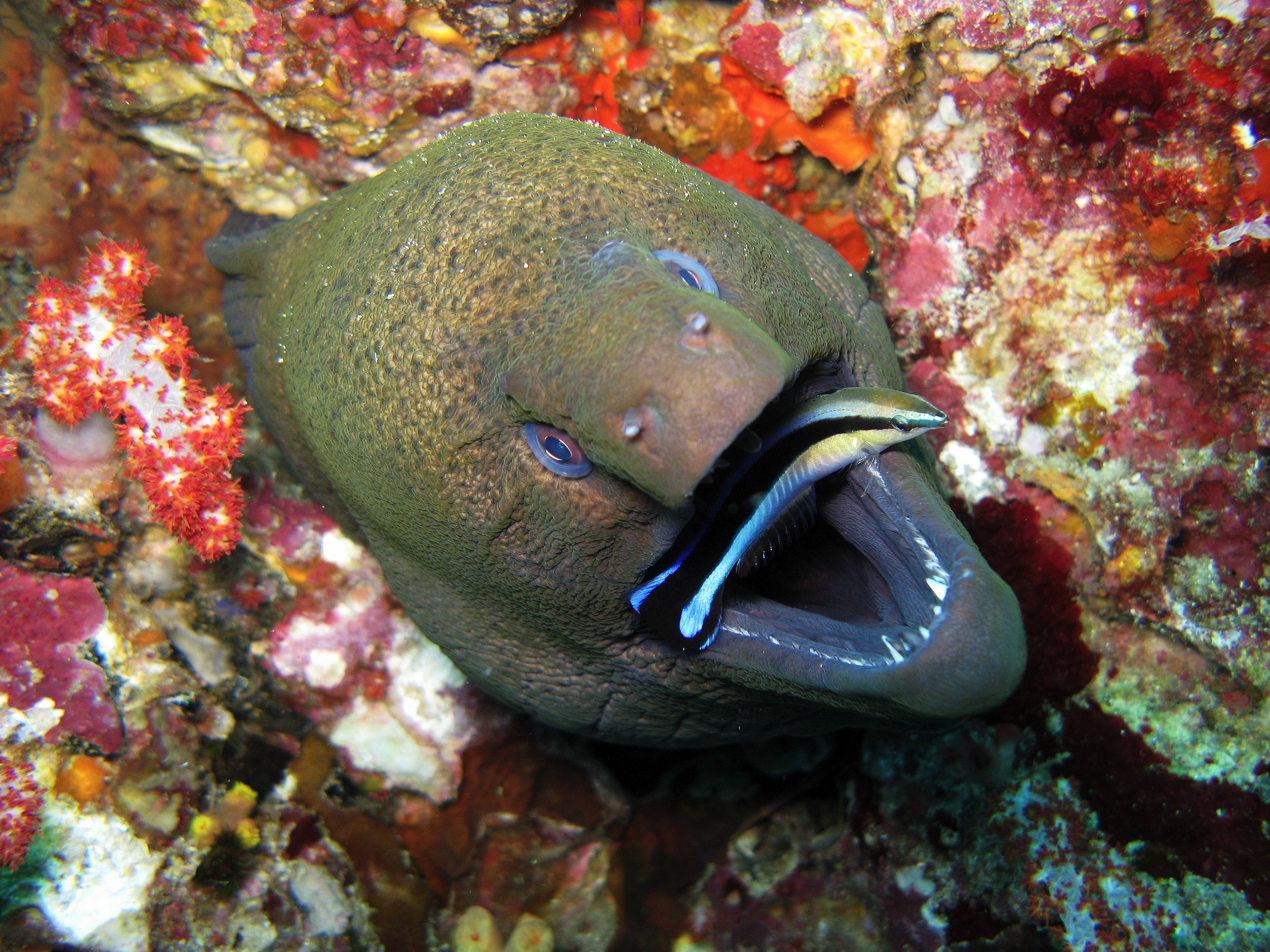
Getting cleaned

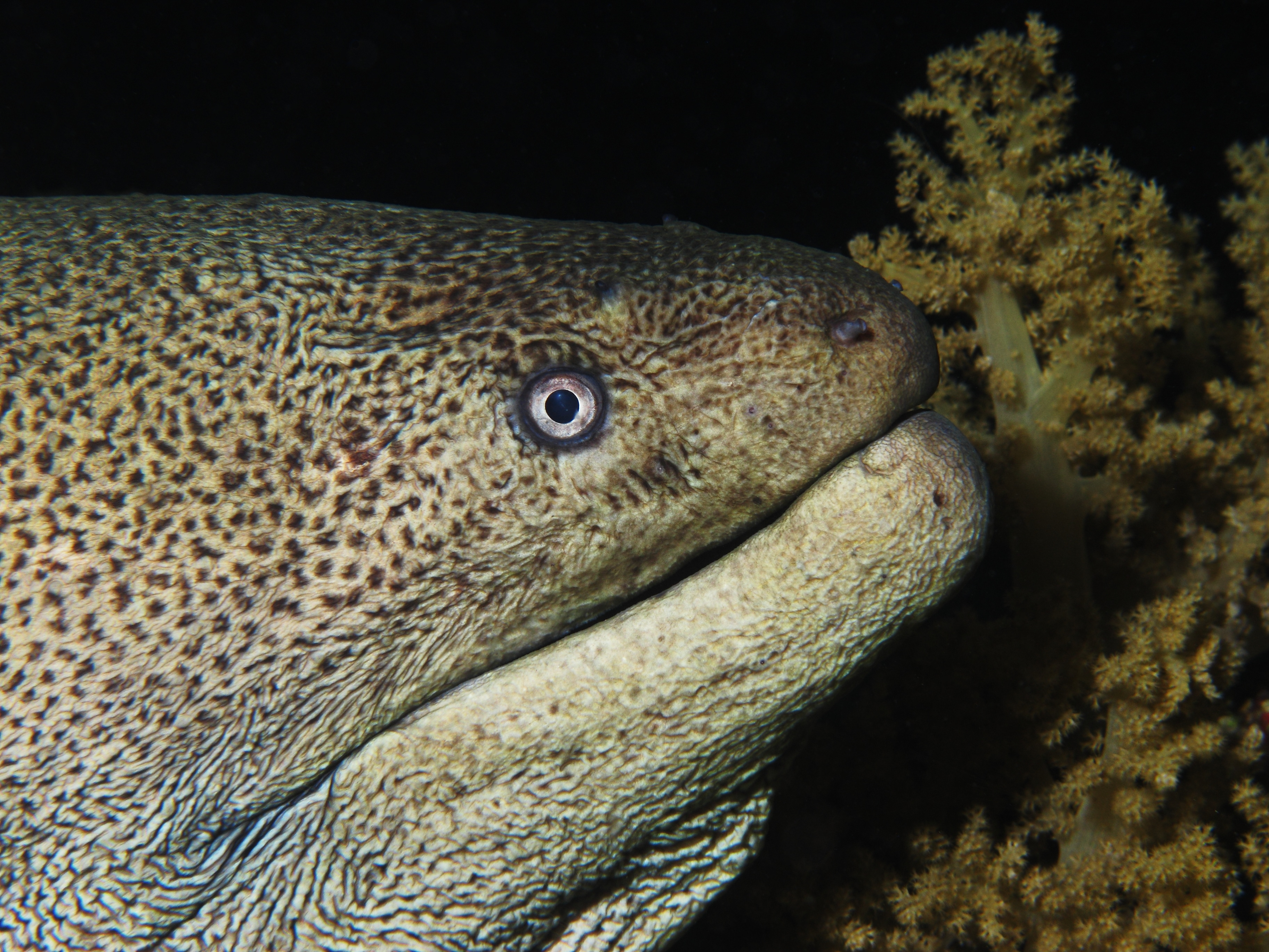
Giant moray from the Red Sea
