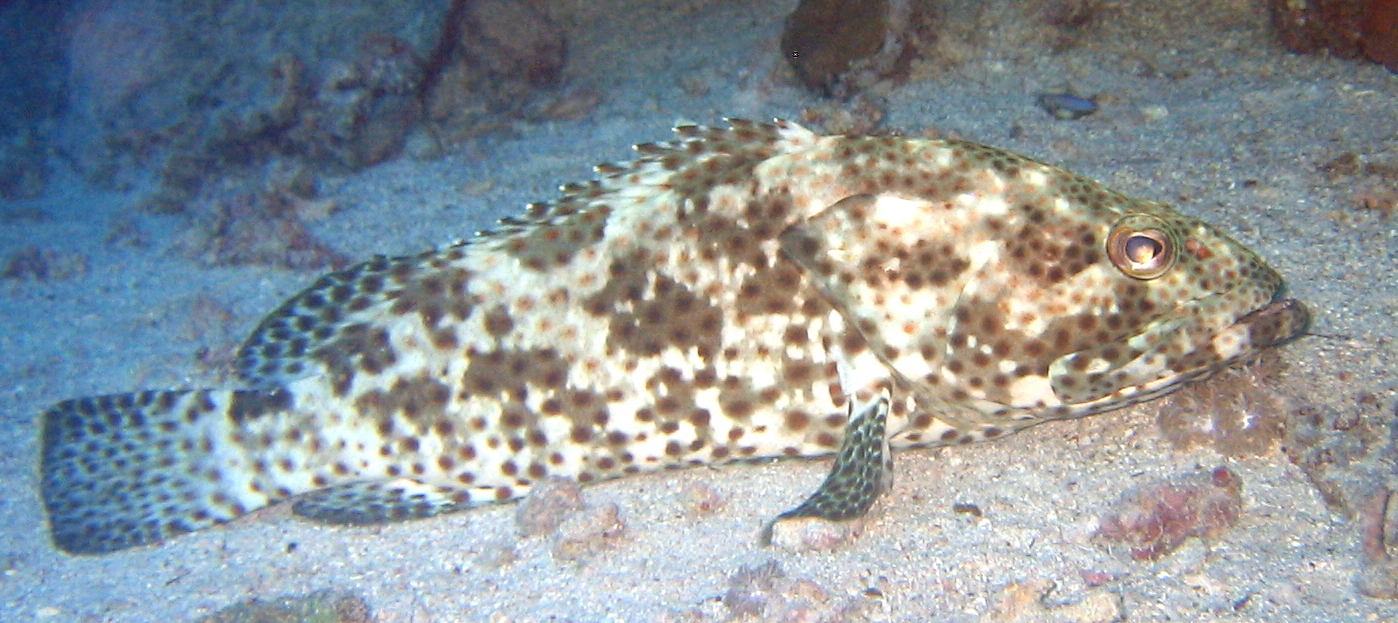

Conservation status
- Vulnerable (IUCN 3.1)

Scientific classification
- Kingdom: Animalia
- Phylum: Chordata
- Class: Actinopterygii
- Order: Perciformes
- Family: Epinephelidae
- Genus: Epinephelus
- Species: E. polyphekadion

Binomial name
- Epinephelus polyphekadion (Bleeker, 1849)

Synonyms
- Serranus polyphekadion Bleeker, 1849; Serranus goldmanni Bleeker, 1855; Epinephelus goldmani (Bleeker, 1855); Serranus microdon Bleeker, 1856; Epinephelus microdon (Bleeker, 1856)

= Camouflage grouper =

Species of fish

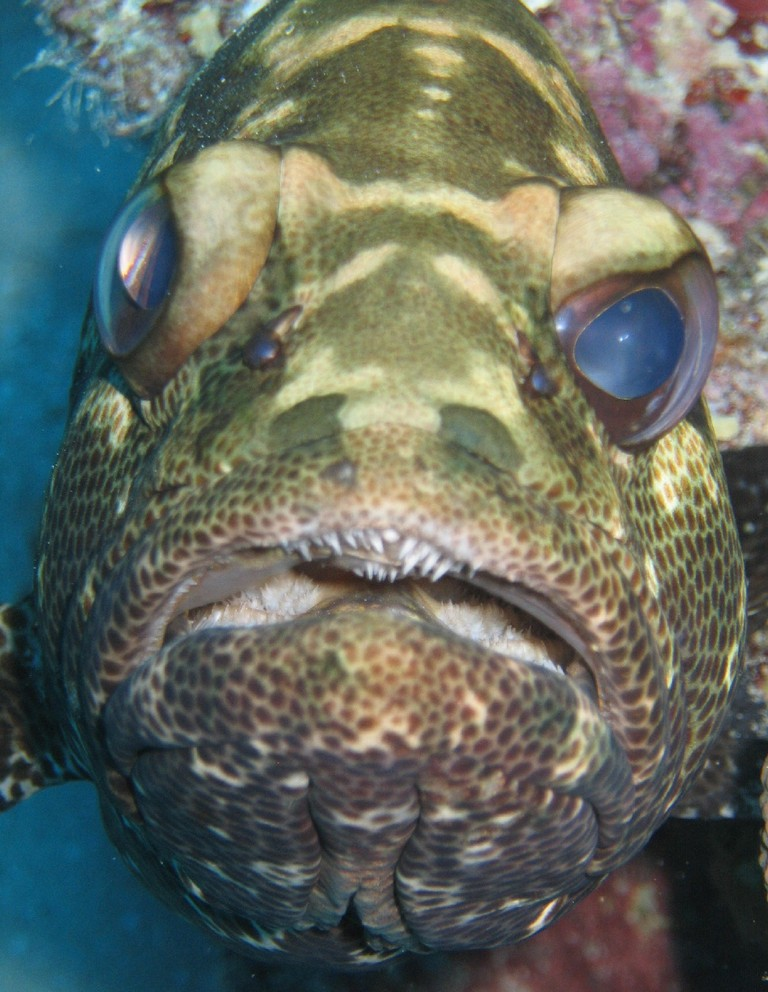
Camouflage grouper

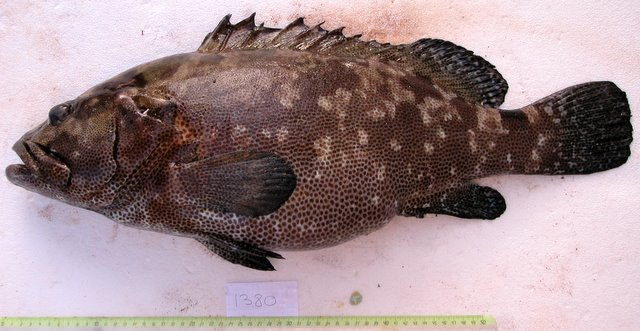
Epinephelus polyphekadion, large specimen from New Caledonia

The camouflage grouper (Epinephelus polyphekadion), also known as the blue-tailed cod, camouflage rockcod, small-toothed rockcod, smooth flowery rock-cod, snout-spot grouper or snout-spot rock-cod, is a species of marine ray-finned fish, a grouper from the subfamily Epinephelinae which is part of the family Serranidae, which also includes the anthias and sea basses. It has a wide Indo-Pacific distribution where it is associated with reefs. There is actually a French documentary called Le Mystère Mérou ("The Grouper Mystery") about the spawning and behavior of these fish shot in the Atol of Fakarava in French Polynesia.

== Description ==
The camouflage grouper has a body which has a standard length that is 2.7 to 3.1 times its depth. The area between the eyes is flat while the dorsal profile of the head is convex. The preopercle rounded with the serrations at its corner slightly enlarged and the gill cover has a distinctly convex upper edge. The dorsal fin has 11 spines and 14-15 soft rays while the anal fin contains 3 spines and 8 soft rays. The fourth spine in the dorsal fin is longer than the others and the membranes between the dorsal fin spines are slightly notched. The caudal fin is rounded in shape. This is a pale brown species which is covered in small dark brown spots. The upper body is whitish, with the white being broken up by large dark blotches which resemble diagonal bands. There is a dark saddle-like blotch on the upper part of the base of the caudal fin. This species is frequently misidentified, the confusion species being Epinephelus fuscoguttatus. The camouflage grouper attains a maximum total length of 90 centimetres (35 in).

== Distribution ==
The camouflage grouper has a wide Indo-Pacific distribution. Its range extends from the coast of East Africa from the Red Sea south to Mozambique, eastwards across the Indian Ocean where it is found around the Comoros, British Indian Ocean Territory, Mauritius and the Seychelles and east into the Pacific Ocean as far as French Polynesia. In the Pacific its range extends north to southern Japan and south as far as Australia. In Australia it is found from Shark Bay and Scott Reef in Western Australia around the northern coast to One Tree Island in Queensland. It is also found around reefs and islands in the Coral Sea and the Tasman Sea.

== Habitat and biology ==
The camouflage grouper is found in lagoons and outer reefs in shallow water in areas which are rich in coral and is more numerous around islands, especially atolls. It also likes to have caves and crevices in the reefs to swim through. It is normally found in small schools but it can be a solitary species. It prefers areas where the water is clear. This is a predatory species which preys largely on crustaceans, especially portunid crabs, and fishes, occasionally on cephalopods and gastropods. It is thought to be gonochoristic and hermaphroditism is still to be demonstrated for this species. It reaches sexual maturity at around 4 years of age and can live for up to 42 years. They form spawning aggregations and individuals are known to follow regular migratory routes to reach these aggregations.

== Taxonomy ==
The camouflage grouper was first formally described as Serranus polyphekadion in 1849 by the Dutch medical doctor, herpetologist and ichthyologist Pieter Bleeker (1819-1878) with the type locality given as Jakarta.

== Utilisation ==
The camouflage grouper was common in the fish markets of Zanzibar in the past. It is of high value to the trade in international live reef fish in southeast Asia, the western Pacific and in areas of the Indian Ocean. Almost all fish caught are fished for at spawning aggregations. The major exporting nations are the Philippines and Indonesia. There is an important commercial fishery in southern part of the Red Sea coast of Saudi Arabia. Fishermen catch this with hook-and-line, spears and traps in Australia and Papua New Guinea. They have been produced in hatcheries but this has not yet proven to be commercially sustainable.
