= List of Plasmodium species infecting birds =

Species in six subgenera of Plasmodium infect birds - Bennettinia, Giovannolaia, Haemamoeba, Huffia, Novyella and Papernaia. Giovannolaia appears to be a polyphytic group and may be subdivided in the future.

== Species ==
Plasmodium accipiteris
Plasmodium alaudae
Plasmodium alloelongatum
Plasmodium anasum
Plasmodium ashfordi
Plasmodium bambusicolai
Plasmodium beaucournui
Plasmodium bertii
Plasmodium bioccai
Plasmodium bigueti
Plasmodium biziurae
Plasmodium buteonis
Plasmodium caloti
Plasmodium cathemerium
Plasmodium circumflexum
Plasmodium coggeshalli
Plasmodium columbae
Plasmodium coluzzii
Plasmodium corradettii
Plasmodium coturnix
Plasmodium dherteae
Plasmodium dissanaikei
Plasmodium dorsti
Plasmodium durae
Plasmodium elongatum
Plasmodium fallax
Plasmodium formosanum
Plasmodium forresteri
Plasmodium gabaldoni
Plasmodium gallinacium
Plasmodium garnhami
Plasmodium ghadiriani
Plasmodium ginsburgi
Plasmodium giovannolai
Plasmodium globularis
Plasmodium golvani
Plasmodium griffithsi
Plasmodium gundersi
Plasmodium guangdong
Plasmodium hegneri
Plasmodium hermani
Plasmodium hexamerium
Plasmodium huffi
Plasmodium jeanriouxi
Plasmodium jiangi
Plasmodium juxtanucleare
Plasmodium kempi
Plasmodium lenoblei
Plasmodium lophurae
Plasmodium lutzi
Plasmodium matutinum
Plasmodium megaglobularis
Plasmodium merulae
Plasmodium mohammedi
Plasmodium nucleophilum
Plasmodium pachysomum
Plasmodium papernai
Plasmodium paranucleophilum
Plasmodium parvulum
Plasmodium pediocetti
Plasmodium paddae
Plasmodium pfefferi
Plasmodium pinotti
Plasmodium polare
Plasmodium polymorphum
Plasmodium relictum
Plasmodium reniai
Plasmodium rouxi
Plasmodium sergentorum
Plasmodium snounoui
Plasmodium stellatum
Plasmodium tenue
Plasmodium tejerai
Plasmodium tumbayaensis
Plasmodium valkiunasi
Plasmodium vaughani

== Avian host records ==
- P. accipiteris - Levant sparrowhawk (Accipiter brevipes)
- P. alloelongatum - Levant sparrowhawk (Accipiter brevipes)
- P. ashfordi - great reed warblers (Acrocephalus arundinaceus), crossbill (Loxia curvirostra), siskin (Spinus spinus)
- P. bioccai - skylark (Alauda arvensis), magpie (Pica pica)
- P. bigueti - house sparrow (Passer domesticus)
- P. biziurae - musk duck (Biziura lobata)
- P. buteonis - common buzzard (Buteo buteo)
- P. cathemerium - red-winged blackbird (Agelaius phoeniceus), great horned owl (Bubo virginianus), house finch (Carpodacus mexicanus), blue jay (Cyanocitta cristata), blue tit (Cyanistes caeruleus), wood thrush (Hylocichla mustelina), song sparrow (Melospiza melodia), northern mockingbird (Mimus polyglottos leucopterus), cowbirds (Molothrus ater ater), house sparrow (Passer domesticus), magpies (Pica pica budsonia), bronze grackle (Quiscalus quiscula aeneus), northern cardinal (Richmondena cardinalis), canary (Serinus canaria), starling (Sturnus vulgaris), house wren (Troglodytes aedon), robin (Turdus migratorius), white-throated sparrow (Zonotrichia albicollis)
- P. circumflexum - sharp-shinned hawk (Accipiter striatus), red-winged blackbird (Agelaius phoeniceus), wood duck (Aix sponsa), canvasbacks (Aythya valisineria), common pochard (Aythya ferina), blue jay (Cyanocitta cristata), Cape May warbler (Dendroica tigrina), gray cat bird (Dumetella carolinensis), slate colour junicao (Junico hymenalis), song sparrow (Melospiza melodia), common merganser (Mergus merganser), cowbird (Molothrus ater ater), northern cardinal (Richmondena cardinalis cardinalis), trumpeter swan (Olor buccinator), chestnut-tailed starling (Sturnus malabaricus), brown thrasher (Toxostoma rufum), American robin (Turdus migratorius), juniper thrush (Turdus pilaris), wild guineafowl (Numida meleagris) and white-throated sparrow (Zonotrichia albicollis)
- P. dissanaikei - Ross-ringed parakeet (Psittacula krameri manillensis)
- P. dherteae - skylark (Alauda arvensis), magpie (Pica pica)
- P. dorseti - skylark (Alauda arvensis), magpie (Pica pica)
- P. durae - turkeys (Meleagris species), common peafowl (Pavo cristatus), francolins (Franoclinus leucoscepus and Franoclinus levialanti levialanti), Japanese quail (Coturnix japonica), Lady Amherst pheasants (Chrysophus amherstiae)
- P. elongatum - great reed warblers (Acrocephalus arundinaceus), red-tailed hawk (Buteo jamaicensis), New Zealand bellbird (Anthornis melanura), bobwhite quail (Colinus virginianus virginianus), bald eagle (Haliaeetus leucocephalus), honeycreeper (Loxops parva), eastern screech owl (Otus asio), black-footed penguins (Spheniscus demersus),
- P. fallax - pygmy owl (Glaucidium passerinum), turkeys (Meleagris species), helmeted guineafowl (Numida meleagris)
- P. forresteri - eastern screech-owls (Otus asio), great horned owls (Bubo virginianus), barred owls (Strix varia), bald eagles (Haliaeetus leucocephalus), red-shouldered hawks (Buteo lineatus), broad-winged hawks (Buteo platypterus), red-tailed hawks (Buteo jamaicensis)
- P. gabaldoni - muscovy duck (Cairina moschata), rock pigeon (Columba livia)
- P. gallinaceum - red junglefowl (Gallus gallus)
- P. garnhami - rain quail (Coturnix coromandelica)
- P. ghadiriani - skylark (Alauda arvensis), magpie (Pica pica)
- P. giovannolai - red-billed choughs (Pyrrhocorax pyrrhocorax), blackbird (Turdus merula)
- P. globularis - yellow-whiskered greenbul (Andropadus latirostris)
- P. griffithsi - wild turkeys (Meleagris gallopavo intermedia)
- P. gundersi - eastern screech owl (Otus asio)
- P. guangdong - red-whiskered bulbul (Pycnonotus jocosus)
- P. hegneri - common teal (Anas crecca)
- P. hermani - turkey (Meleagris gallopavo), bobwhite (Colinus virginianus)
- P. hexamerium - skylark (Alauda arvensis), magpie (Pica pica), eastern bluebird (Sialia sialis)
- P. jiangi - red-whiskered bulbul (Pycnonotus jocosus)
- P. juxtanucleare - red junglefowl (Gallus gallus), black-footed penguins (Spheniscus demersus), white eared-pheasant (Crossoptilon crossoptilon)
- P. kempi - turkey (Meleagris gallopavo), bobwhite (Colinus virginianus), chukar (Alectoris graeca), guinea fowl (Numida meleagris), peacocks (Pavo cristatus), canary (Serinus canaria). Mallards (Anas platyrhynchos) and domestic geese (Anser anser) may be transiently infected.
- P. loprae - Peking duck (Anas platyrhynchos)
- P. lucens - olive sunbird (Cyanomitra (Nectarinia) olivacea)
- P. lutzi - grey necked wood rail (Aramides cajaneus) and the great thrush (Turdus fuscater)
- P. matutinum - pigeon and dove (Colubma species)
- P. megaglobularis - olive sunbird (Cyanomitra (Nectarinia) olivacea)
- P. merulae - blackbird (Turdus merula)
- P. mohammedi - house sparrow (Passer domesticus biblicus)
- P. multivacuolaris - yellow-whiskered greenbul (Andropadus latirostris)
- P. nucleophilium - great tit (Parus major), gray catbird (Dumetella carolinensis)
- P. nucleophilum toucani - Swainson's toucan (Ramphastos swainsonii)
- P. octamerium - pintail whydah bird (Vidua macroura)
- P. pachysomum - tawny pipit (Anthus campestris)
- P. paddae - Java sparrow (Padda oryzivora)
- P. parahexamerium - white-tailed alethe (Alethe diademata)
- P. paranucleophilum - South American tanager
- P. parvulum - vanga species
- P. pedioecetii - lesser prairie-chicken (Tympanuchus pallidicinctus), Darwin's nothura (Nothura darwinii), grouse
- P. pfefferi - magpie (Pica pica)
- P. pinotti - bananaquit (Coereba flaveola), orangequit (Euneornis campestris), yellow-shouldered grassquit (Loxipasser anoxanthus), black-faced grassquit (Tiaris bicolor)
- P. polare - bald eagle (Haliaeetus leucocephalus), barn swallow (Hirundo rustica), yellow wagtails (Motacilla flava) and cliff swallows (Petrochelidon pyrrhonota)
- P. polymorphum - skylark (Alauda arvensis)
- P. relictum - skylark (Alauda arvensis), reed warbler (Acrocephalus scirpaceus), New Zealand bellbird (Anthornis melanura), little night owl (Athene noctua), house finch (Carpodacus mexicanus), blue quail (Coturnix chinensis), blue tit (Cyanistes caeruleus), Gyr falcons (Falco rusticolus), chaffinch (Fringilla coelebs), red-backed shrike (Lanius collurio), common crossbill (Loxia curvirostra), Hawaiian honeycreeper, yellow wagtail (Motacilla flava), house sparrow (Passer domesticus), magpie (Pica pica), red-billed choughs (Pyrrhocorax pyrrhocorax), tree sparrow (Passer montanus), great tit (Parus major), the bearded tit (Panurus biarmicus), siskin (Spinus spinus), Magellanic penguins (Spheniscus magellanicus), black-footed penguins (Spheniscus demersus), starling (Sturnus vulgaris), pheasant (Tragopan satyra), white-eyed thrush (Turdus jamaicensis), yellow-faced grassquit (Tiaris olivacea)
- P. rouxi - skylark (Alauda arvensis), partridge
- P. sergentorum - skylark (Alauda arvensis), magpie (Pica pica)
- P. snounoui - magpie (Pica pica)
- P. stellatum - spotted flycatcher (Muscicapa striata)
- P. tenue - babbler (Garrulax canorus taewanus), Pekin robin (Leiothrix lutea)
- P. tejerai - turkey (Meleagris gallopavo)
- P. tumbayaensis - thrush (Planethicus anthracinus)
- P. vaughani - warbler (Acrocephalus schoenobaenus), blackbird (Agelaius phoeniceus), goldfinch (Carduelis carduelis), blue jay (Cyanocitta cristata), yellow warbler (Setophaga petechia), robin (Erithacus rubecula), junco (Junco hyemalis hyemalis), red-billed leiothrix (Leiothrix lutea), bullfinch (Loxigilla violacea), house sparrow (Passer domesticus), the weaver (Ploceus cucullatus), the grackle (Quiscalus quiscula), the canary (Serinus canaria), the blackcap (Sylvia atricapilla), the pigeon (Spilopelia senegalensis), eastern meadowlark (Sturnella magna), starling (Sturnus vulgaris) black-faced grassquit (Tiaris bicolor), white-eyed thrush (Turdus jamaicensis), the blackbird (Turdus merula) and American sparrows (Zonotrichia species).

== Subspecies of avian malaria ==
- P. nucleophilum has at least one subspecies - P. nucleophilum toucani
- P. relictum has been divided into subspecies: P. relictum capistranoae, P. relicturn matutinum, P. relictum quentini and P. relictum relictum.

Interrelatedness

- P. durae is related to P. asanum, P. circumflexum, P. fallax, P. formosanum, P. gabaldoni, P. hegneri, P. lophrae, P. lophrae, P. pediocetti, P. pinotti, and P. polare.
- P. gallinacium is related to P. griffithsi
- P. relictum is related to P. cathemerium, P. giovannolai and P. matutinum. P. relictum may be difficult to distinguish from P. giovannolai on either morphological grounds or on the basis of host species.
- P. hexamerium is related to P. vaughni.
- P. ashfordi is related to P. vaughni.

== Vectors of avian malaria ==
- Aedes species:
- Aedes aegypti - P. gallinacium
- Aedes hesperonotius - P. gallinacium

- Culex species:
- Culex fatigans - P. relictum
- Culex pipiens - P. cathermerium, P. paddae
- Culex pipiens pipiens - P. kempi
- Culex nigripalpus - P. elongatum, P. hermani
- Culex quinquefasciatus - P. relictum
- Culex restuans - P. elongatum, P. forresteri
- Culex salinarius - P. elongatum, P. hermani
- Culex stigmatastoma - P. relictum
- Culex tarsalis - P. kempi, P. hexamerium, P. relictum

- Culiseta species
- Culiseta morsitans - P. circumflexum
- Mansonia species:
- Mansionia crassipes - P. circumflexum, P. gallinacium
- Theobaldia species
- Theobaldia annulata - P. circumflexum

Notes:

Sporogeny of P. circumflexum but not transmission has been recorded in Mansonia perturbans.

== Avian malaria notes ==
- P. relictum is known to infect over 70 bird families and 359 wild bird species so the record here should be regarded as incomplete. Additional host species can be found under the link Plasmodium relictum. It is likely that this species has been responsible for more bird extinctions than any other protist.
- P. vaughani is the second commonest species of avian malaria parasites after P. relictum.
- P. inconstans, P. irae, P. praecox, P. subpraecox and P. wasielewski have been re classified as P. relictum. P. subpraecox was described by Grassi and Feletti in 1892. P. wasielewski was described by Brumpt in 1909.
- P. elongatum infects 21 bird families and 59 species of bird. Additional host species are given under the link Plasmodium elongatum.
- P. dominicana is a species known only from fossil amber. It is thought to have been a species infecting birds. It has been placed in the subgenus Nyssorhynchus.
- The taxonomic status of P. corradettii (Laird, 1998) is currently regarded as dubious and may be revised.
- P. huffi may be the same species as P. nucleophilum toucani.
- P. oti is now regarded as the same species as P. hexamerium.
- There are currently 13 species recognised in the subgenus Novyella all of which are listed here.

A number of additional species have been described in birds - P. centropi, P. chloropsidis, P. gallinuae, P. herodialis, P. heroni, P. mornony, P. pericorcoti and P. ploceii - but the suggested speciation was based at least in part on the idea - 'one host - one species'. It has not been possible to reconcile the descriptions with any of the currently recognised species, and these are not currently regarded as valid species. As further investigations are made into this genus these species may be resurrected.

A species P. japonicum has been reported but this appears to be the only report of this species and should therefore be regarded of dubious validity.
