= Plasmodium hegneri =

Scientific classification
- Domain: Eukaryota
- Clade: Sar
- Clade: Alveolata
- Phylum: Apicomplexa
- Class: Aconoidasida
- Order: Haemospororida
- Family: Plasmodiidae
- Genus: Plasmodium
- Subgenus: Papernaia
- Species: P. hegneri

Binomial name
- Plasmodium hegneri Manwell & Kuntz, 1966

Species of single-celled organism

Plasmodium hegneri is a parasite of the genus Plasmodium subgenus Papernaia.

Like all Plasmodium species P. hegneri has both vertebrate and insect hosts. The vertebrate hosts for this parasite are birds.

== Description ==
The parasite was first described by Manwell and Kuntz in 1966.

It is related to the following species

Plasmodium asanum
Plasmodium circumflexum
Plasmodium durae
Plasmodium fallax
Plasmodium formosanum
Plasmodium gabaldoni
Plasmodium lophrae
Plasmodium lophrae
Plasmodium pediocetti
Plasmodium pinotti
Plasmodium polare

== Geographical occurrence ==
This species was originally isolated in Taiwan but is likely to be much more widespread.

== Clinical features and host pathology ==
This species infects the common or European teal (Anas crecca).
