= Plasmodium polare =

Scientific classification
- Domain: Eukaryota
- Clade: Sar
- Clade: Alveolata
- Phylum: Apicomplexa
- Class: Aconoidasida
- Order: Haemospororida
- Family: Plasmodiidae
- Genus: Plasmodium
- Subgenus: Papernaia
- Species: P. polare

Binomial name
- Plasmodium polare (Manwell, 1934)

Species of single-celled organism

Plasmodium polare is a parasite of the genus Plasmodium subgenus Papernaia.

Like all Plasmodium species P. polare has both vertebrate and insect hosts. The vertebrate hosts for this parasite are birds.

== Description ==
The parasite was first described by Manwell in 1934.

It is relatively small and produces on the average nine merozoites per infection. It has abundant cytoplasm.

== Geographical occurrence ==
This parasite occurs in the United States.

== Clinical features and host pathology ==
Hosts of this species include the bald eagle (Haliaeetus leucocephalus), the barn swallow (Hirundo rustica), yellow wagtails (Motacilla flava) and American cliff swallows (Petrochelidon pyrrhonota).

== Related species ==
It is related to the following species:

Plasmodium asanum
Plasmodium circumflexum
Plasmodium durae
Plasmodium fallax
Plasmodium formosanum
Plasmodium gabaldoni
Plasmodium hegneri
Plasmodium lophrae
Plasmodium lophrae
Plasmodium pediocetti
Plasmodium pinotti
