= Papernaia =

Scientific classification
- Domain: Eukaryota
- Clade: Sar
- Clade: Alveolata
- Phylum: Apicomplexa
- Class: Aconoidasida
- Order: Haemospororida
- Family: Plasmodiidae
- Genus: Plasmodium
- Subgenus: Papernaia; Landau, Chavatte, Peters & Chabaud 2010

Species
- Plasmodium ashfordi Plasmodium beaucournui Plasmodium bertii Plasmodium columbae Plasmodium dherteae Plasmodium durae Plasmodium formosanum Plasmodium gabaldoni Plasmodium garnhami Plasmodium golvani Plasmodium hegneri Plasmodium hexamerium Plasmodium jeanriouxi Plasmodium lenoblei Plasmodium nucleophilum Plasmodium paranucleophilum Plasmodium pediocetae Plasmodium pinotti Plasmodium polare Plasmodium reniai Plasmodium rouxi Plasmodium snounoui Plasmodium valkiunasi

Subgenus, parasites causing bird malaria

Papernaia is a subgenus of the genus Plasmodium, all of which are parasitic protozoa. The subgenus was created in 2010 by Landau et al. It may be synonymous with Novyella.

Species in this subgenus infect birds with malaria.
