= Plasmodium durae =

Scientific classification
- Domain: Eukaryota
- Clade: Sar
- Clade: Alveolata
- Phylum: Apicomplexa
- Class: Aconoidasida
- Order: Haemospororida
- Family: Plasmodiidae
- Genus: Plasmodium
- Species: P. durae

Binomial name
- Plasmodium durae Herman, 1941

Species of single-celled organism

Plasmodium durae is a parasite of the genus Plasmodium subgenus Giovannolaia.

Like all Plasmodium species P. durae has both vertebrate and insect hosts. The vertebrate hosts for this parasite are birds.

== Description ==
The parasite was first described by Herman in 1941.

Mature gametocytes tend to lie obliquely within the host cell, displace the nucleus to one pole of the cell and possess one or more clumps of clear pigment granules.

== Systematics ==
It is related to the following species:

Plasmodium asanum
Plasmodium circumflexum
Plasmodium fallax
Plasmodium formosanum
Plasmodium gabaldoni
Plasmodium hegneri
Plasmodium lophrae
Plasmodium lophrae
Plasmodium pediocetti
Plasmodium pinotti
Plasmodium polare

== Geographical occurrence ==
This species is found in the United States of America and South Africa.

== Clinical features and host pathology ==
Hosts of this species include domestic turkeys (Meleagris gallopavo) and Swainson's Francolin (Francolinus swainsoni).
