= Plasmodium alaudae =

Scientific classification
- Domain: Eukaryota
- Clade: Sar
- Clade: Alveolata
- Phylum: Apicomplexa
- Class: Aconoidasida
- Order: Haemospororida
- Family: Plasmodiidae
- Genus: Plasmodium
- Species: P. alaudae

Binomial name
- Plasmodium alaudae (Celli & Sanfelice, 1891)

Species of single-celled organism

Plasmodium alaudae is a parasite of the genus Plasmodium.

Like all Plasmodium species P. alaudae has both vertebrate and insect hosts. The vertebrate hosts for this parasite are birds.

== Description ==
The species was originally described by Celli & Sanfelice in 1891 as Haemoproteus alaudae, and it was first discovered in the blood of the skylark. The species was later transferred to the genus Plasmodium. On reexamination the described species was found to include members of at least one additional species and it was redescribed by Paperna et al. in 2009.

Trophozoites: the parasites are small and are located at ends of the erythrocyte. The erythrocyte nucleus is minimally displaced if at all.

Schizonts: these are rounded with clear cytoplasm and have 8 nuclei. There are a few vacuoles and two granules of pigment.

Gametocytes: these have not been described.

=== Differential diagnosis ===
The species must be differentiated from Plasmodium ashfordi, Plasmodium caloti and Plasmodium vaughani merulae.

Plasmodium ashfordi produces 7–8 merozoites per schizont but P. alaudae lacks the fan shaped schizonts found in P. ashfordi.

Plasmodium caloti is unique among the species with 8–10 merozoites per schizont infecting the skylark (Alauda arvensis) in the enlargement of the erythrocyte that it causes.

Although P. vaughani may also produce 8 merozoites per schizont, it possesses a bluish refractile globule that is not found in P. alaudae.

== Geographical occurrence ==
The parasite is found in France and Italy.

== Vectors ==
Not known.

== Clinical features and host pathology ==
Plasmodium alaudae infects the magpie (Pica pica) - the type host - and the skylark (Alauda arvensis).
