= Mario Pinotti =

A picture of Mario Pinotti

Mario Pinotti (21 January 1894 – 3 March 1972) was a Brazilian medic and sanitarist. As director of the Brazilian National Malaria Service, Mario Pinotti pioneered chloroquinized salt in Brazil during the early 1950s in order to eradicate malaria.

== Biography ==
Mario Pinotti was born in Brotas, São Paulo state, in 1894 to Rafael Vitório Pinotti and Precilda Bossel Pinotti. Mario attended the pharmacy school at Ouro Preto, Minas Gerais, and graduated in 1918 at the National College of Medicine, at the Federal University of Rio de Janeiro. After graduation, Mario Pinotti was appointed as rural sanitary inspector of the National Department of Public Health in 1919. In 1922 he assumed as mayor of Nova Iguaçu, Rio de Janeiro. Back to the National Health Department, Pinotti worked in the campaign against yellow fever from 1928 to 1931. Mario Pinotti married Margarida Pinotti, and they had two children.

== Pinotti's method ==
During the 1940s, there were four to six million malaria cases a year among 45 million Brazilians, with over half of cases occurring outside of the Amazon basin. The São Paulo State Antimalarial Service, the Special Public Health Service in the Amazon (SESP) and the National Malaria Service (SNM) were the three Brazilian organizations involved in malaria control. The SNM was created in 1941 and was run by Mario Pinotti starting in 1942. In 1956, Pinotti became the director of the newly created National Department for Rural Endemic Diseases, a department in the Ministry of Health that centralized public health activities against many endemic diseases including malaria, yellow fever and Chagas disease. In response to the 1955 WHO establishment of the Global Malaria Eradication Program, in 1957 Pinotti changed the National Malaria Service into the Malaria Eradication Campaign (CEM). Pinotti introduced the strategy of putting chloroquine into common cooking salt as a way of distributing the drug as a prophylactic on a wide scale. Using either chloroquine or pyrimethamine, Pinotti's medicated salt program proved effective, and became known as "Pinotti's method". After early 1950s trials, Pinotti's salt was widely distributed in Brazil, subsequently, it was employed in South America as well as parts of Africa and Asia.

In the 1960s, the use of chloroquinized salt became to fade due to concern that targeted populations were unevenly protected. In Amazonas State, chloroquinized salt distribution was no longer required, but it was distributed until supplies ran out. Still, chloroquinized salt continued to be used in French Guiana (1967-1971), Guyana (1961-1965) and Suriname (1966-1972).

Mario Pinotti died in Rio de Janeiro, on March 3, 1972, at the age of 78.

== Recognition ==
Parasite species Plasmodium pinotti was named in honor of Dr. Mario Pinotti.

== Publications ==
- O problema da malária transmitida por Kerteszia no sul do Brasil
- Grande programa de erradicação da malária no Brasil, 1951
- Campanha contra a doença de Chagas, 1956
- Vida e morte do brasileiro, 1959
