= Plasmodium vaughani =

Scientific classification
- Domain: Eukaryota
- Clade: Sar
- Clade: Alveolata
- Phylum: Apicomplexa
- Class: Aconoidasida
- Order: Haemospororida
- Family: Plasmodiidae
- Genus: Plasmodium
- Subgenus: Novyella
- Species: P. vaughani

Binomial name
- Plasmodium vaughani Novy & MacNeal, 1904

Subspecies
- See text

Species of single-celled organism

Plasmodium vaughani is a parasite of the genus Plasmodium, and the type species of the subgenus Novyella. As in all Plasmodium species, P. vaughani has both vertebrate and insect hosts. The vertebrate hosts for this parasite are birds.

== Taxonomy ==
The parasite was first described by Novy & MacNeal in 1904.

=== Subspecies ===
- Plasmodium vaughani merulae Corradetti and Scanga 1972
- Plasmodium vaughani tenue Laveran and Marullaz 1914
- Plasmodium vaughani vaughani Novy and MacNeal 1904

== Description ==
The length of the asexual cycle is 24 hours.

Trophozoites: Ring forms are unusual. The trophozoite is usually irregular in outline. The nucleus is small and there may be a single clear outgrowth of the cytoplasm. One or two small pigment granules may be seen. These forms are found in mature and polychromatic erythrocytes.

Schizonts: These are usually found in a polar or sub polar position within the host cell but may be found anywhere within the cell. They are found in mature or polychromatic erythrocytes. Mature forms measure 2.3 to 5.4 micrometres in width and 1.5 to 4.4 micrometres in length. They are irregular in shape but tend to be round or ovoid. Within each schizont are 4-8 merozoites. These are usually arranged in a fan like fashion but may occur at random. A transparent globule may be present along with one to three pigment granules. The host nucleus is not normally displaced.

Gametocytes: The macro- and microgametocytes are very similar except for size in this species. They are elongated, possess 2-24 (usually 10) pigment granules which may be found in clumps and are usually found in mature erythrocytes. The nucleus is pale, compact and central in position. The gametocyte usually lies along the host cell nucleus but young gametoctyes may adhere to the host cell membrane. The host nucleus is not normally displaced. They are 8.0 to 13.7 micrometres in length and 1.2 to 2.8 micrometres in width.

Asexual replication appears to occur in three ways:

(1) by repeated binary fission of the chromatin with eventual splitting of the cytoplasm

(2) by the splitting of an elongate parasite into merozoites having a bead-like arrangement

(3) by the similar breaking-up of a ring-shaped form with a resulting ring of merozoites

== Distribution ==
P. vaughani has been reported from regions across the globe, with the exception of Australia.

== Hosts ==
The type host of P. vaughani is Turdus migratorius. However, various other birds can be infected by P. vaughani, including the canary which has been used as an experimental host in studies. Different strains of P. vaughani develop in different mosquitoes. Most P. vaughani do not develop in most Aedes, Anopheles, or Culex mosquitoes; however, specific strains of P. vaughani have been described that replicate in Culiseta morsitans and Culex pipiens.

Additional known hosts for this species include the warbler (Acrocephalus schoenobaenus), the blackbird (Agelaius phoeniceus), the goldfinch (Carduelis carduelis), the blue jay (Cyanocitta cristata), the yellow warbler (Setophaga petechia), the robin (Erithacus rubecula), junco (Junco hyemalis hyemalis), the red-billed leiothrix (Leiothrix lutea), the bullfinch (Loxigilla violacea), house sparrow (Passer domesticus), the weaver (Ploceus cucullatus), the grackle (Quiscalus quiscula), the canary (Serinus canaria), the blackcap (Sylvia atricapilla), the pigeon (Spilopelia senegalensis), eastern meadowlark (Sturnella magna), starling (Sturnus vulgaris) black-faced grassquit (Tiaris bicolor), white-eyed thrush (Turdus jamaicensis), the blackbird (Turdus merula) and American sparrows (Zonotrichia species).

== Role in disease ==
Naturally and experimentally infected birds do not appear to show signs of illness from infection with P. vaughani.
