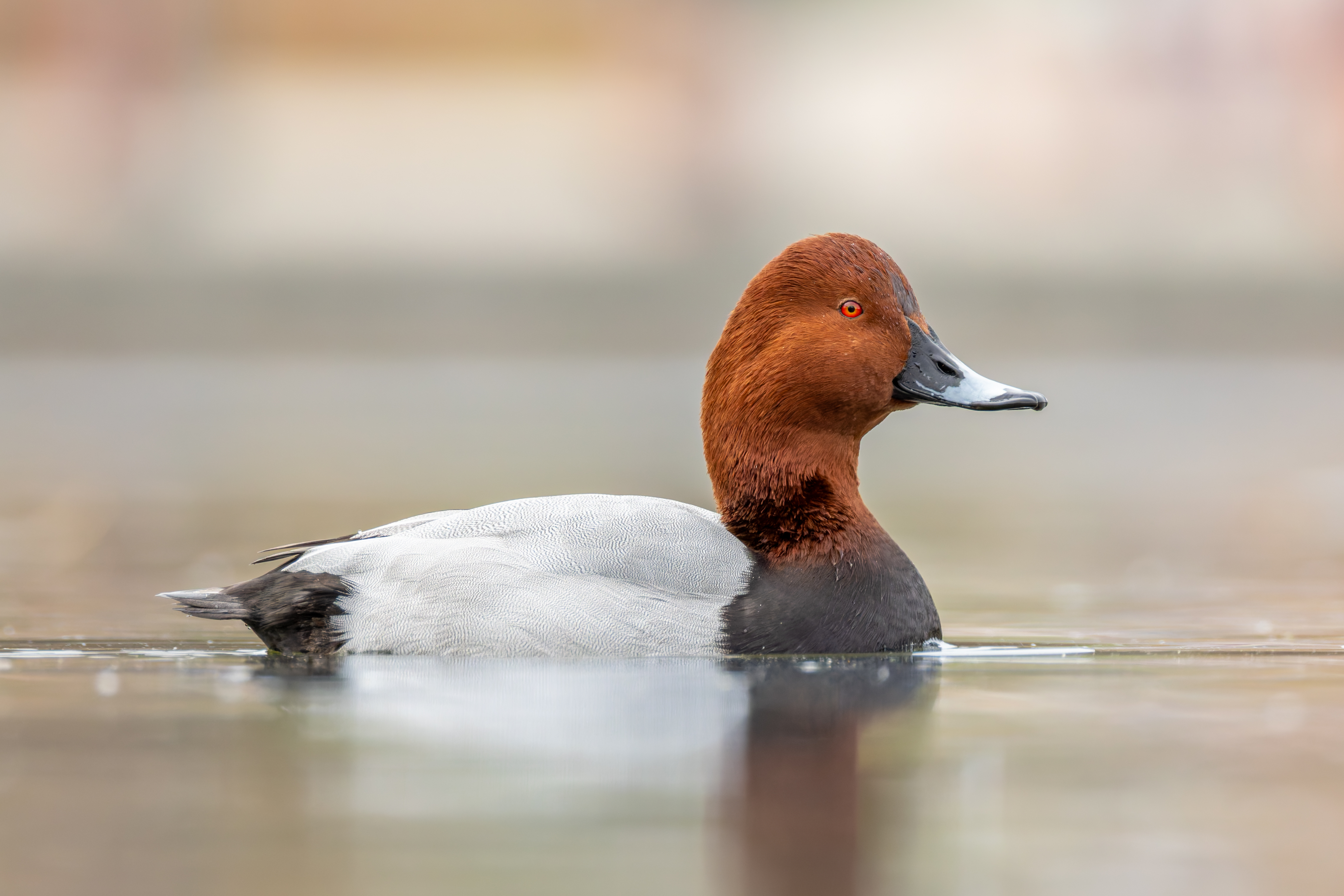
- Male
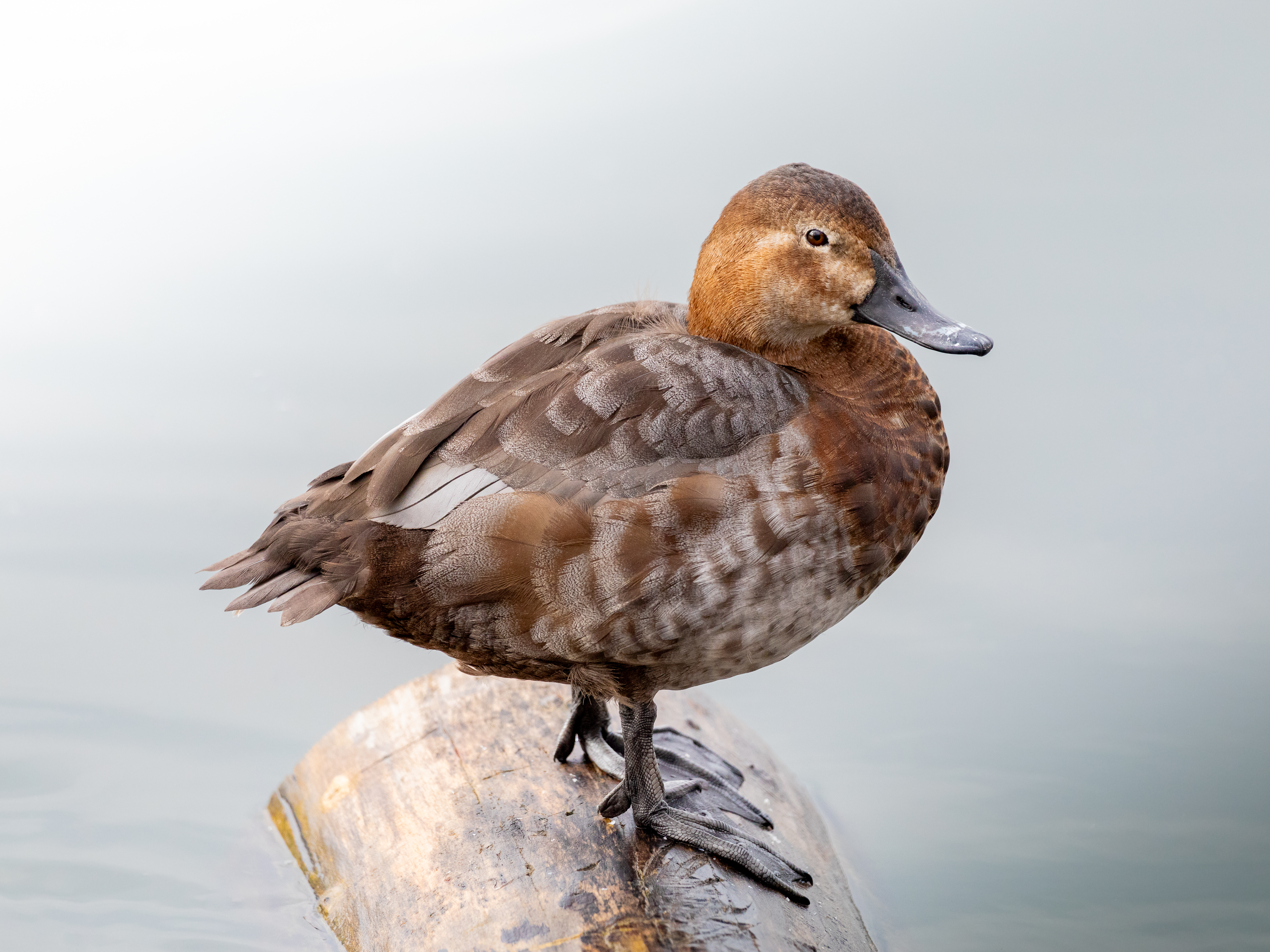
- Female

Conservation status
- Vulnerable (IUCN 3.1)

Scientific classification
- Kingdom: Animalia
- Phylum: Chordata
- Class: Aves
- Order: Anseriformes
- Family: Anatidae
- Genus: Aythya
- Species: A. ferina

Binomial name
- Aythya ferina (Linnaeus, 1758)
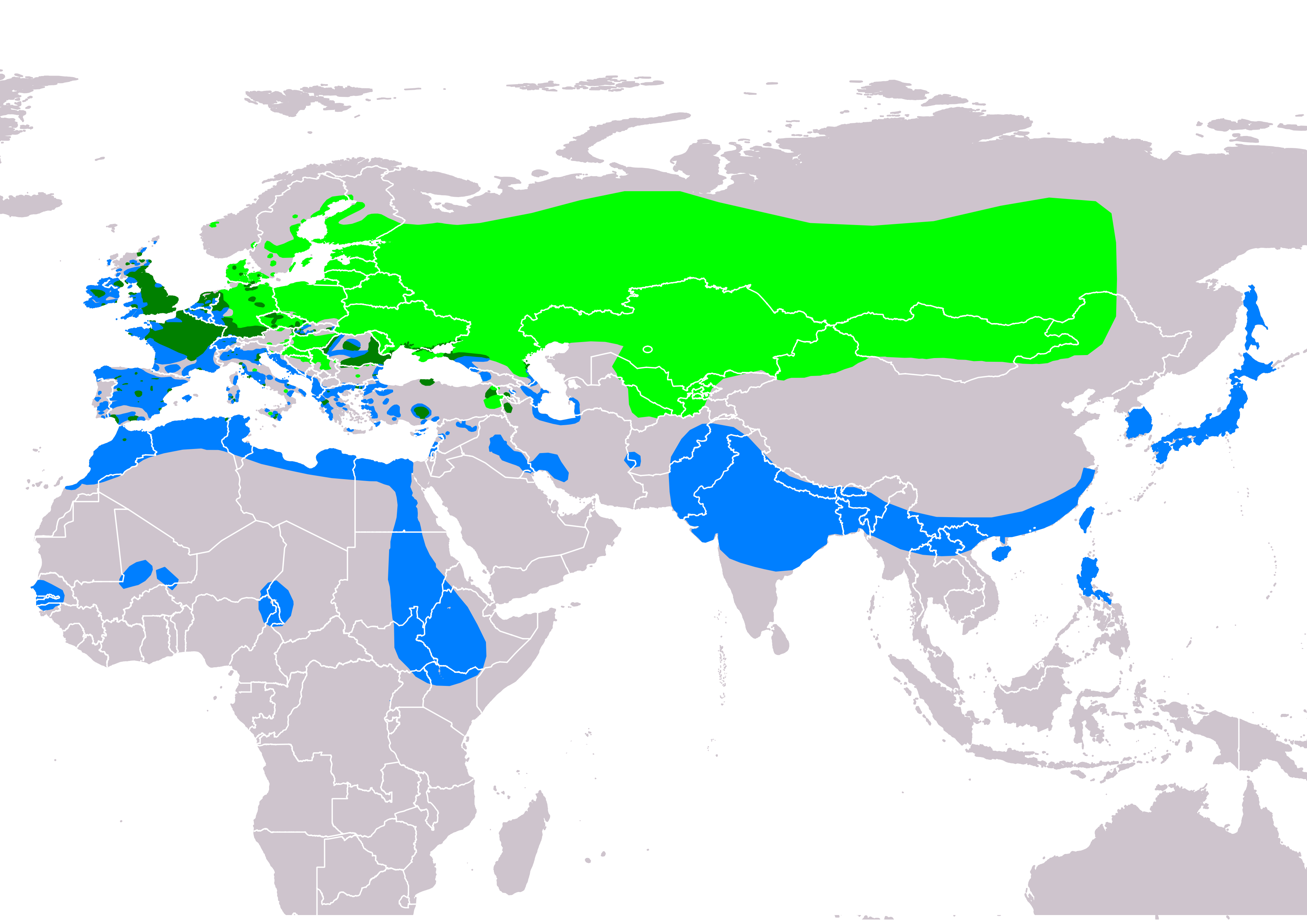
- Range of A. ferina Breeding Resident Non-breeding

Synonyms
- Anas ferina Linnaeus, 1758; Anas rufa Gmelin 1788; Aristonetta ferina (Linnaeus, 1758); Fuligula ferina (Linnaeus, 1758); Nyroca ferina (Linnaeus, 1758)

= Common pochard =

Species of bird

The common pochard (/ˈpɒtʃərd/; Aythya ferina), known simply as pochard in the United Kingdom, is a medium-sized diving duck in the family Anatidae. It is widespread across the Palearctic. It breeds primarily in Scandinavia and the steppe regions of Siberia, and winters farther south and west.

== Taxonomy and systematics ==
Swedish taxonomist Carl Linnaeus first assigned a scientific name to the common pochard in the tenth edition of his landmark treatise Systema Naturae; this was the first edition which included such names. He called the duck Anas ferina. In 1822, German zoologist Friedrich Boie created the genus Aythya for various diving ducks, and moved the common pochard to that new genus. Uptake of Aythya as the genus for the common pochard was mixed for much of the next century, with some authors leaving the duck in the genus Anas or assigning it to various other now-defunct genera instead. The common pochard is considered a superspecies with the canvasback. In the past, the redhead of North America was thought to be a subspecies, but the common pochard is now agreed to be monotypic, with no subspecies. It is known to have hybridised with tufted duck and ferruginous duck in captivity, and these known combinations resemble suspected hybrids seen in the wild, which may share the same parentage. Hybridisations with the red-crested pochard have also been reported.

The genus name Aythya is derived from the Ancient Greek word aithuia, an unidentified seabird mentioned by authors including Hesychius and Aristotle. The species name is the Latin word ferina, meaning "wild game" (derived from ferus, meaning "wild"). The common name "pochard" was first applied to the duck in the mid-1500s; its origin and etymology is unknown. It is also sometimes known as European pochard, Eurasian pochard, or (particularly in the UK) simply pochard.

== Description ==
The common pochard is a plump, medium-sized diving duck, measuring 42–49 cm (17–19 in) in length, with a wingspan of 72–82 cm (28–32 in). It is stocky and short-tailed, with a sloping forehead and relatively long bill. Its weight (which has been reported only for winter birds) ranges from 467 to 1,240 g (16.5 to 43.7 oz). Males average larger and heavier than females. Like most ducks, it is sexually dimorphic.

The male has a chestnut-coloured head and neck, a black breast and tail, and a pale grey body, marked with fine vermiculations. His bill is dark grey, with a wide blue-grey band across the middle. His iris is yellow-orange to red, growing brighter in the breeding season.

The legs and feet are grey in both sexes and all ages. The female's iris is brown, sometimes tending towards yellowish-brown. The juvenile's iris is yellow-olive, but attains its adult colour during the first winter.

=== Voice ===
The male is generally silent, though he may whistle softly as part of his courtship display. The female growls softly—a sound transcribed as krrr—if she is flushed. The duckling has a short contact call of two to four notes. If distressed, its calls are higher and faster than are those of Anas ducklings of the same size and age.

=== Similar species ===
The male common pochard is quite similar to the male canvasback, but the latter has an all-dark bill. It is also similar to the redhead, but the latter has a yellow iris and a greyer back.

== Distribution and habitat ==
Their breeding habitat consists of marshes and lakes with a metre or more water depth. Pochards breed in much of temperate and northern Europe and across the Palearctic. They are migratory, and spend winter in the south and west of Europe.

In the British Isles, birds breed in eastern England and lowland Scotland, in small numbers in Northern Ireland with numbers increasing gradually, and sporadically in the Republic of Ireland, where it may also be increasing. While uncommon, individuals are also occasionally seen in the south of England, and small populations are sometimes observed on the River Thames. Large numbers stay overwinter in Great Britain, after the birds retreat from Russia and Scandinavia.

Common pochards have been seen as vagrants in North America, especially in the United States and Canada. In South America, a record of the species exists from Colombia.

== Ecology ==
These are gregarious birds; they form large flocks in winter, often mixing with other species of diving duck. They are strong fliers; in direct, flapping flight, they can reach speeds of 22–24 m/s (49–54 mph).

=== Food and feeding ===
Common pochards feed on plant material (including seeds), small fish, molluscs, and other aquatic invertebrates. They feed primarily by diving to retrieve items from under the water's surface; however, they will also upend and dabble at items on the water's surface. They do most of their feeding at night.

They regularly forage in close association with Bewick's and whooper swans, two species that trample underwater sediment to excavate food. Studies have shown that this behaviour greatly increases the food intake rate of the pochards, as they glean food items that drift away from where the swans are trampling. This rate can be double what it would be if the birds were feeding on their own.

=== Breeding ===
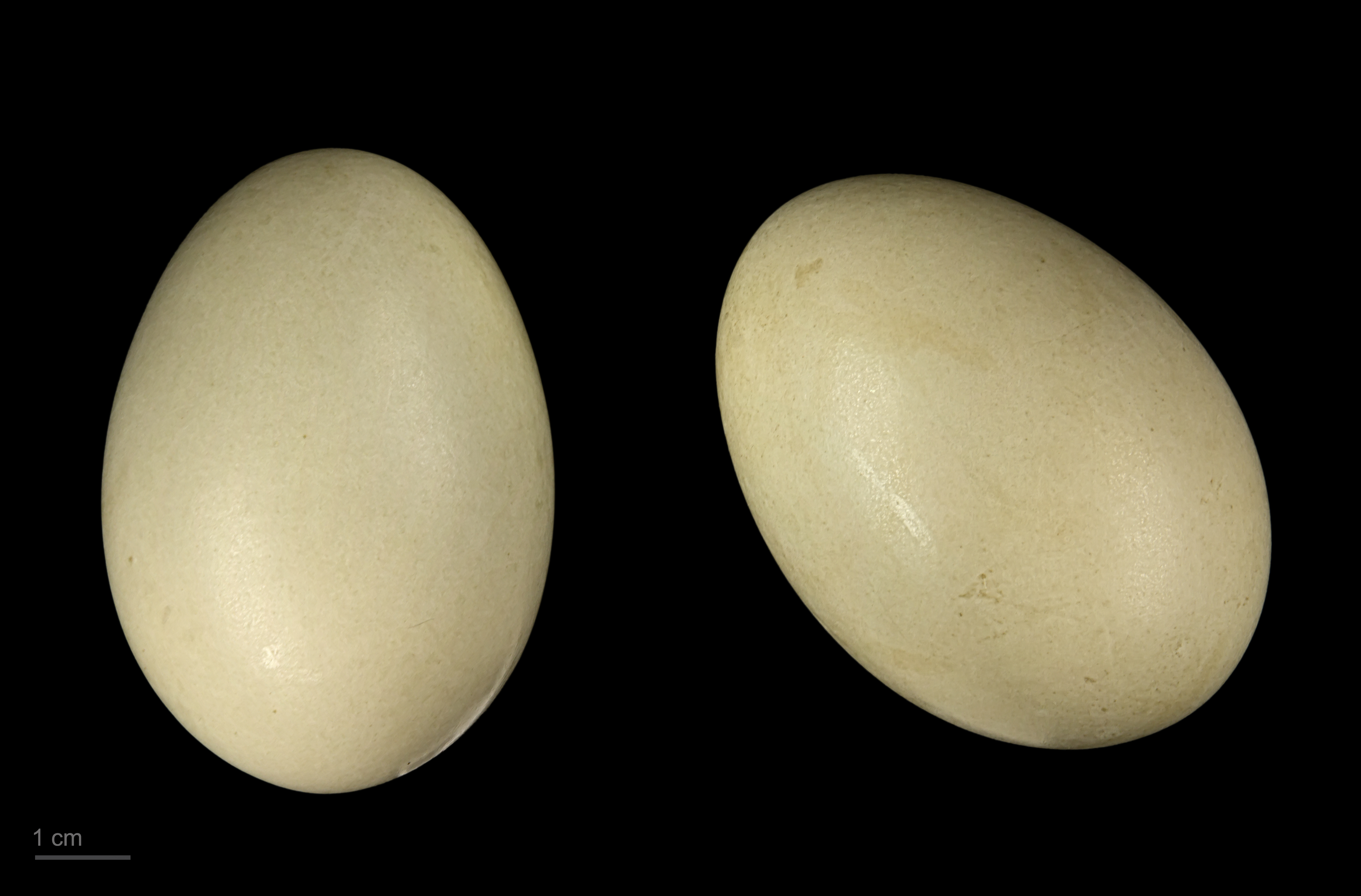
Eggs from the collection of the Museum of Toulouse

The female builds a platform nest of plant material, with a shallow cup lined with down feathers near its centre. This is placed either on the ground within 10 m (33 ft) of the water's edge or in the water with the platform rising above the water's surface. It is always located in dense cover. The female lays one egg daily until her clutch—typically 8–10 eggs—is complete. Only then does she begin incubation. The eggs are greenish-grey and broadly oval, measuring 62 mm × 44 mm (2.4 in × 1.7 in) on average. They are incubated by the female and hatch synchronously after around 25 days. When off the nest the female will cover the eggs with down. The young are precocial, nidifugous and can feed themselves. They fledge when aged 50–55 days.

Like many ducks, common pochards suffer a high rate of parasitic egg-laying, a behaviour also known as egg dumping. Studies have shown that as many as 89% of nests in some areas contain one or more eggs not laid by the incubating female. The percentage of parasitic eggs may reach as high as 37% of all eggs laid in some populations. There appears to be little cost to the incubating female for accepting eggs that are not her own, and indeed she will roll any egg left close to her nest into her clutch. However, if the number of parasitic eggs exceeds six, she is twice as likely to abandon her nest. Females sometimes lay their eggs in the nests of other duck species as well; red-crested pochards are unwitting hosts in some areas.

Levels of nest predation can be high, particularly for nests located in upland areas. Those located on islands, or over water (on artificial platforms) do significantly better, presumably because water deters at least some mammalian predators. Nesting success depends on a number of factors, including the age of the female, her body mass, the date the nest was started, and the size of the clutch. Older, heavier birds are more successful than younger, lighter ones. Smaller, earlier-laid clutches are less likely to be abandoned than larger, later ones.

== Conservation and threats ==
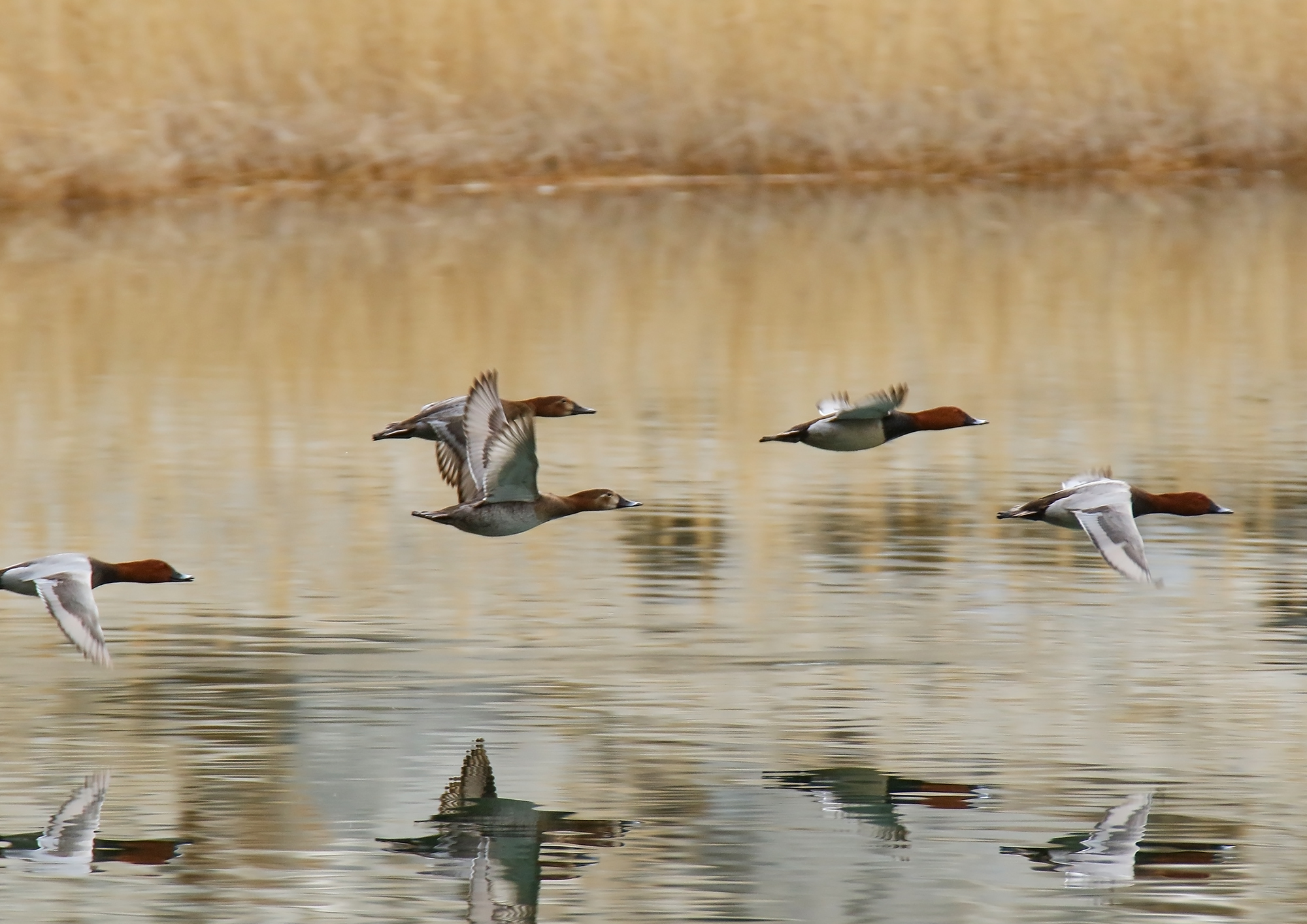
Common pochards are strong fliers, capable of reaching speeds of 22–24 m/s (49–54 mph).

The common pochard is one of the species protected by the Agreement on the Conservation of African-Eurasian Migratory Waterbirds (AEWA). The International Union for Conservation of Nature rates the species as vulnerable. Though it has a huge range and an extremely large population, there is evidence of precipitous declines in several regions. These reach somewhere in the range of 30–49 per cent over a 23-year period in Europe, for example. In number of countries, its population is decreasing mainly due to the urbanization and transformation of the natural habitats, as well as due to overhunting. Introduced predators, such as the American mink, have wreaked havoc on some populations. In Poland, for example, one studied population showed a 92 per cent decrease in the 30 years after mink first became established in the area. Birds, including carrion crows and marsh harriers are important nest predators.

A further threat to conservation efforts of this bird is that 75 official languages are spoken across the countries in which it is found, thus scientific knowledge is scattered across those different languages, and collaboration on conservation efforts is more difficult.

It is the host for a variety of internal parasites, including cestodes, nematodes and trematodes. These include Paramonostomum aythyae, a trematode which was first isolated from the common pochard; it is carried in the gut. In some locations, the common pochard may be an important vector of avian schistosomes, which are harboured in the bird's nasal and mesenteric blood vessels. These schistosomes can be transmitted to humans who work or swim in the same wetland areas as the ducks, potentially causing cercarial dermatitis. Known blood parasites include Haemoproteus greineri, Haemoproteus nettionis and Plasmodium circumflexum. It is also known to carry Toxoplasma gondii.

== Notes ==
=== References ===
- AEWA (2018). Agreement on the Conservation of African-Eurasian Migratory Waterbirds (AEWA): Agreement Text and Annexes (PDF) (Report).
- Albrecht, Tomáš; Hořák, David; Kreisinger, Jakub; Weidinger, Karel; Klvaňa, Petr & Michot, Thomas C. (June 2006). "Factors Determining Pochard Nest Predation along a Wetland Gradient". The Journal of Wildlife Management. 70 (3): 784–791. doi:10.2193/0022-541X(2006)70[784:FDPNPA]2.0.CO;2. JSTOR 3803433. S2CID 85161456.
- Amat, Juan A. (January 1993). "Parasitic Laying in Red-Crested Pochard Netta rufina Nests". Ornis Scandinavica (Scandinavian Journal of Ornithology). 24 (1): 65–70. doi:10.2307/3676412. JSTOR 3676412.
- Athari, Amid; Gohar-Dehi, Shaban & Rostami-Jalilian, Mojtaba (January 2006). "Determination of Definitive and Intermediate Hosts of Cercarial Dermatitis-producing Agents in Northern Iran". Archives of Iranian Medicine. 9 (1): 11–15. PMID 16649371.
- Baird, Spencer F.; Brewer, Thomas M. & Ridgway, Robert (1884). The Water Birds of North America, Volume II. Boston, MA: Little, Brown, & Co.
- BirdLife International (2021). "Aythya ferina". IUCN Red List of Threatened Species. 2021 e.T22680358A205288455. doi:10.2305/IUCN.UK.2021-3.RLTS.T22680358A205288455.en.
- Blums, Peter; Mednis, Aivars & Clark, Robert G. (November 1997). "Effect of Incubation Body Mass on Reproductive Success and Survival of Two European Diving Ducks: A Test of the Nutrient Limitation Hypothesis" (PDF). The Condor. 99 (4): 919–925. Bibcode:1997Condo..99..916B. doi:10.2307/1370142. JSTOR 1370142.
- Boie, F. (1822). "Ueber Classification, infonderheit de europaischen Vogel". Isis von Oken (in German). 1822: 545–564.
- Brzeziński, Marcin; Żmihorski, Michał; Nieoczym, Marek; Wilniewczyc, Piotr & Zalewski, Andrzej (January 2020). "The expansion wave of an invasive predator leaves declining waterbird populations behind". Diversity and Distributions. 26 (1): 138–150. Bibcode:2020DivDi..26..138B. doi:10.1111/ddi.13003. JSTOR 26828519.
- Carboneras, Carles (1992). "Family Anatidae (Ducks, Geese and Swans)". In del Hoyo, Josep; Elliott, Andrew & Sargatal, Jordi (eds.). Handbook of Birds of the World. Vol. I: Ostrich to Ducks. Barcelona, Spain: Lynx Edicions.
- Cramp, Stanley, ed. (1977). Handbook of the Birds of Europe, the Middle East and North Africa. Vol. 1: Ostrich to Ducks. Oxford, UK: Oxford University Press. ISBN 0-19-857358-8.
- Dugger, Bruce D. & Blums, Peter (July 2001). "Effect of Conspecific Brood Parasitism on Host Fitness for Tufted Duck and Common Pochard". The Auk. 118 (3): 717–726. doi:10.1093/auk/118.3.717. JSTOR 4089933.
- Elahi, Rubayet; Islam, Ausraful; Hossain, Mohammad Sharif; Mohiuddin, Khaja; Mikolon, Andrea; Paul, Suman Kumer; Hosseini, Parviez Rana; Daszak, Peter & Alam, Mohammad Shafiul (2014). "Prevalence and Diversity of Avian Haematozoan Parasites in Wetlands of Bangladesh". Journal of Parasitology Research. 2014: 1–12. doi:10.1155/2014/493754. PMC 3918735. PMID 24587896.
- Gill, Frank; Donsker, David & Rasmussen, Pamela (2021). "Screamers, ducks, geese, swans". IOC World Bird List.
- Gyimesi, Abel; van Lith, Bart & Nolet, Bart A. (2012). "Commensal Foraging with Bewick's Swans Cygnus bewickii Doubles Instantaneous Intake Rate of Common Pochards Aythya ferina". Ardea. 100 (1): 55–62. doi:10.5253/078.100.0109.
- Henningsson, Per; Johansson, L. Christoffer & Hedenström, Anders (January 2010). "How swift are swifts Apus apus?". Journal of Avian Biology. 41 (1): 94–98. doi:10.1111/j.1600-048X.2009.04850.x. JSTOR 25662918.
- Hořák, David & Klvaňa, Petr (June 2009). "Alien egg retrieval in common pochard: Do females discriminate between conspecific and heterospecific eggs?" (PDF). Annales Zoologici Fennici. 46 (3): 165–170. doi:10.5735/086.046.0301. JSTOR 23736814. S2CID 55736547.
- Jobling, James A. (2010). The Helm Dictionary of Scientific Bird Names. London, UK: Christopher Helm. ISBN 978-1-4081-2501-4.
- Kear, Janet, ed. (2005). Ducks, Geese and Swans. Vol. 2: Species accounts (Cairina to Mergus). Oxford, UK: Oxford University Press. ISBN 0-19-861009-2.
- Linnaeus, Carl (1758). Systema Naturae per Regna Tria Naturae, Secundum Classes, Ordines, Genera, Species, cum Characteribus, Differentiis, Synonymis, Locis, Volume I (in Latin) (10th ed.). Stockholm: Laurentii Salvii.
- Madge, Steve & Burn, Hilary (1988). Wildfowl: An Identification Guide to the Ducks, Geese and Swans of the World. London, UK: Christopher Helm. ISBN 0-7470-2201-1.
- Mancianti, Francesca; Nardoni, Simona; Mugnaini, Linda; Poli, Alessandro (June 2013). "Toxoplasma gondii in Waterfowl: The First Detection of this Parasite in Anas crecca and Anas clypeata from Italy". The Journal of Parasitology. 99 (4): 561–563. doi:10.1645/12-34.1. JSTOR 41982461. PMID 23145510. S2CID 43056984.
- Petrzelkova, Adela; Klvana, Petr; Albrecht, Tomas & Hořák, David (June 2013). "Conspecific Brood Parasitism and Host Clutch Size in Common Pochards Aythya ferina". Acta Ornithologica. 48 (1): 103–108. doi:10.3161/000164513X670052. S2CID 85797129.
- "Pochard". Lexico. Oxford University Press. Archived from the original on 8 February 2021.
- "Pochard". RSPB.
- "Pochard". The Wildlife Trusts.
- Randler, Christoph (March 2008). "Hybrid Wildfowl in Central Europe: An Overview". Waterbirds: The International Journal of Waterbird Biology. 31 (1): 143–146. JSTOR 25148306.
- Št́ovíček, Ondřej; Kreisinger, Jakub; Javůrková, Veronika & Albrecht, Tomáš (July 2013). "High rates of conspecific brood parasitism revealed by microsatellite analysis in a diving duck, the common pochard Aythya ferina". Journal of Avian Biology. 44 (4): 369–375. doi:10.1111/j.1600-048X.2013.00074.x. JSTOR 24035093.
- Thebo, Asma Kanwal; Naz, Saima; Dharejo, Ali Murtaza; Siyal, Sajid & Birmani, Nadir Ali (2019). "A new record and new species of a digenic trematode from common pochard Aythya ferina (Anseriformes: Anatidae) in Sindh, Pakistan". Journal of Entomology and Zoology Studies. 7 (1): 151–154. ISSN 2320-7078.
