= Plasmodium dissanaikei =

Scientific classification
- Domain: Eukaryota
- Clade: Sar
- Clade: Alveolata
- Phylum: Apicomplexa
- Class: Aconoidasida
- Order: Haemospororida
- Family: Plasmodiidae
- Genus: Plasmodium
- Species: P. dissanaikei

Binomial name
- Plasmodium dissanaikei Jong, 1971

Species of single-celled organism

Plasmodium dissanaikei is a parasite of the genus Plasmodium subgenus Giovannolaia.

Like all Plasmodium species P. dissanaikei has both vertebrate and insect hosts. The vertebrate hosts for this parasite are birds.

== Taxonomy ==
The parasite was first described by Jong in 1971. On morphological grounds it is related to Plasmodium durae.

== Distribution ==
This species is found in Sri Lanka (Ceylon).

== Hosts ==
Hosts of this species include the Ross-ringed Parakeet (Psittacula krameri manillensis) and species from the Columbidae - pigeons and doves.
