= Plasmodium anasum =

Scientific classification
- Domain: Eukaryota
- Clade: Sar
- Clade: Alveolata
- Phylum: Apicomplexa
- Class: Aconoidasida
- Order: Haemospororida
- Family: Plasmodiidae
- Genus: Plasmodium
- Species: P. anasum

Binomial name
- Plasmodium anasum Manwell & Kuntz, 1965

Species of single-celled organism

Plasmodium anasum is a species of the genus Plasmodium subgenus Giovannolaia.

Like all species in this genus it has both vertebrate and insect hosts. The vertebrate host are birds.

== Taxonomy ==
This species was described in 1965 by Manwell and Kuntz.
