= Plasmodium bertii =

Scientific classification
- Domain: Eukaryota
- Clade: Sar
- Clade: Alveolata
- Phylum: Apicomplexa
- Class: Aconoidasida
- Order: Haemospororida
- Family: Plasmodiidae
- Genus: Plasmodium
- Subgenus: Papernaia
- Species: P. bertii

Binomial name
- Plasmodium bertii Gabaldon & Ulloa, 1981

Species of single-celled organism

Plasmodium bertii is a parasite of the genus Plasmodium subgenus Papernaia.

Like all Plasmodium species P. bertii has both vertebrate and insect hosts. The vertebrate hosts for this parasite are birds.

== Description ==
The parasite was first described by Gabaldon and Ulloa in 1981.

== Host record ==
Grey-cowled wood rail (Aramides cajaneus)
