= Plasmodium garnhami =

Scientific classification
- Domain: Eukaryota
- Clade: Sar
- Clade: Alveolata
- Phylum: Apicomplexa
- Class: Aconoidasida
- Order: Haemospororida
- Family: Plasmodiidae
- Genus: Plasmodium
- Subgenus: Papernaia
- Species: P. garnhami

Binomial name
- Plasmodium garnhami Guindy et al., 1965

Species of single-celled organism

Plasmodium garnhami is a parasite of the genus Plasmodium.

Like all Plasmodium species, P. garnhami has both vertebrate and insect hosts. The vertebrate hosts for this parasite are birds.

== Description ==
The parasite was first described by Guindy et al. in 1965.

== Geographical occurrence ==
This species is found in Egypt.

== Clinical features and host pathology ==
Host species include the hoopoe (Upupa epops) and the rain quail (Coturnix coromandelica).
