= Plasmodium polymorphum =

Scientific classification
- Domain: Eukaryota
- Clade: Sar
- Clade: Alveolata
- Phylum: Apicomplexa
- Class: Aconoidasida
- Order: Haemospororida
- Family: Plasmodiidae
- Genus: Plasmodium
- Species: P. polymorphum

Binomial name
- Plasmodium polymorphum Zehtindjiev et al., 2012

Species of single-celled organism

Plasmodium polymorphum is a malarial parasite of the genus Plasmodium. Currently its only known host is the Eurasian skylark, Alauda arvensis.

== Description ==
This species was described by Zehtindjiev et al.

This species shows a marked preference of its blood stages for immature erythrocytes, including erythroblasts. Uniquely for an avian malaria species development and maturation of the gametocytes occur in immature red blood cells. Also uniquely the margins of nuclei in blood stages of are markedly smooth and distinct.

It appears morphologically to be related to the Huffia subgenus but this has yet to be established.

== Geographical occurrence ==
This species was isolated in southern Italy. Because the host carries out an annual migration the parasite may also occur elsewhere.

== Vectors ==
Not known.
