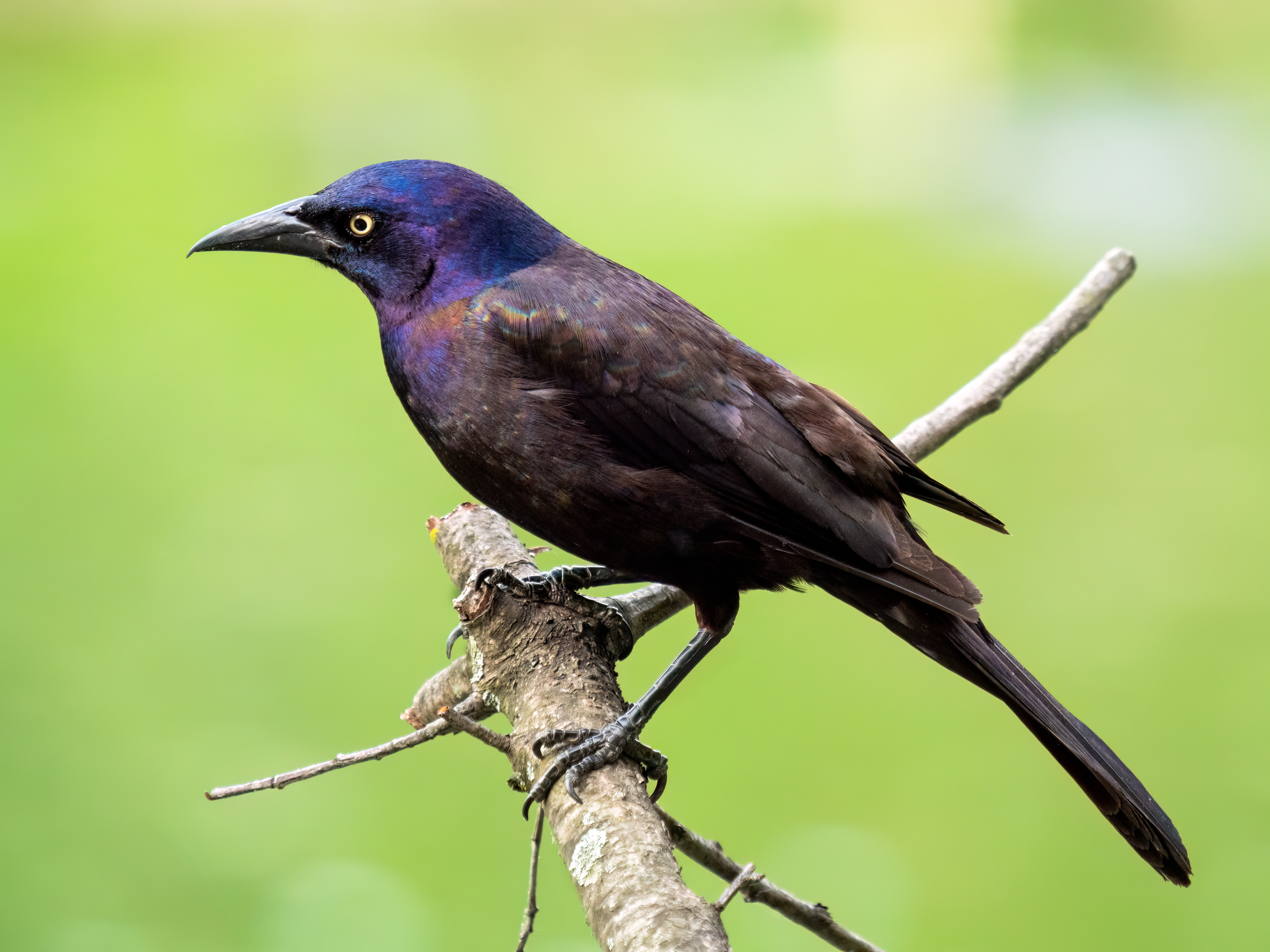

Conservation status
- Near Threatened (IUCN 3.1)

- Secure (NatureServe)

Scientific classification
- Kingdom: Animalia
- Phylum: Chordata
- Class: Aves
- Order: Passeriformes
- Family: Icteridae
- Genus: Quiscalus
- Species: Q. quiscula

Binomial name
- Quiscalus quiscula (Linnaeus, 1758)
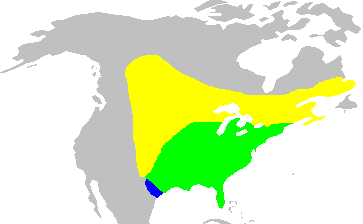
- Approximate range in North America Breeding range Year-round range Wintering range

Synonyms
- Gracula quiscula Linnaeus, 1758

= Common grackle =

Common grackle Temporal range: Pleistocene–present

Species of bird

The common grackle (Quiscalus quiscula) is an icterid bird found in large numbers through much of North America. It was first described in 1758 by Carl Linnaeus and has three officially recognized subspecies. Adult common grackles have a long and dark bill, pale yellow eyes, and a long tail. Adults often have a bluish iridescent appearance on their head, this feature being more pronounced on males. Common grackles can be found widely across North America east of the Rocky Mountains and are highly adaptable to their environment.

== Taxonomy ==
The common grackle was first described in 1758 by Carl Linnaeus in the tenth edition of Systema Naturae, as Gracula quiscula. It was assigned to the genus Quiscalus by French ornithologist Louis Pierre Vieillot in his 1816 Dictionnaire d'histoire naturelle.

Three subspecies are recognized:

- the Florida grackle (Q. q. quiscula) (Linnaeus 1758), the nominate subspecies
- the purple grackle (Q. q. stonei) (Chapman, 1935)
- the bronzed grackle (Q. q. versicolor) (Vieillot, 1816)

== Description ==
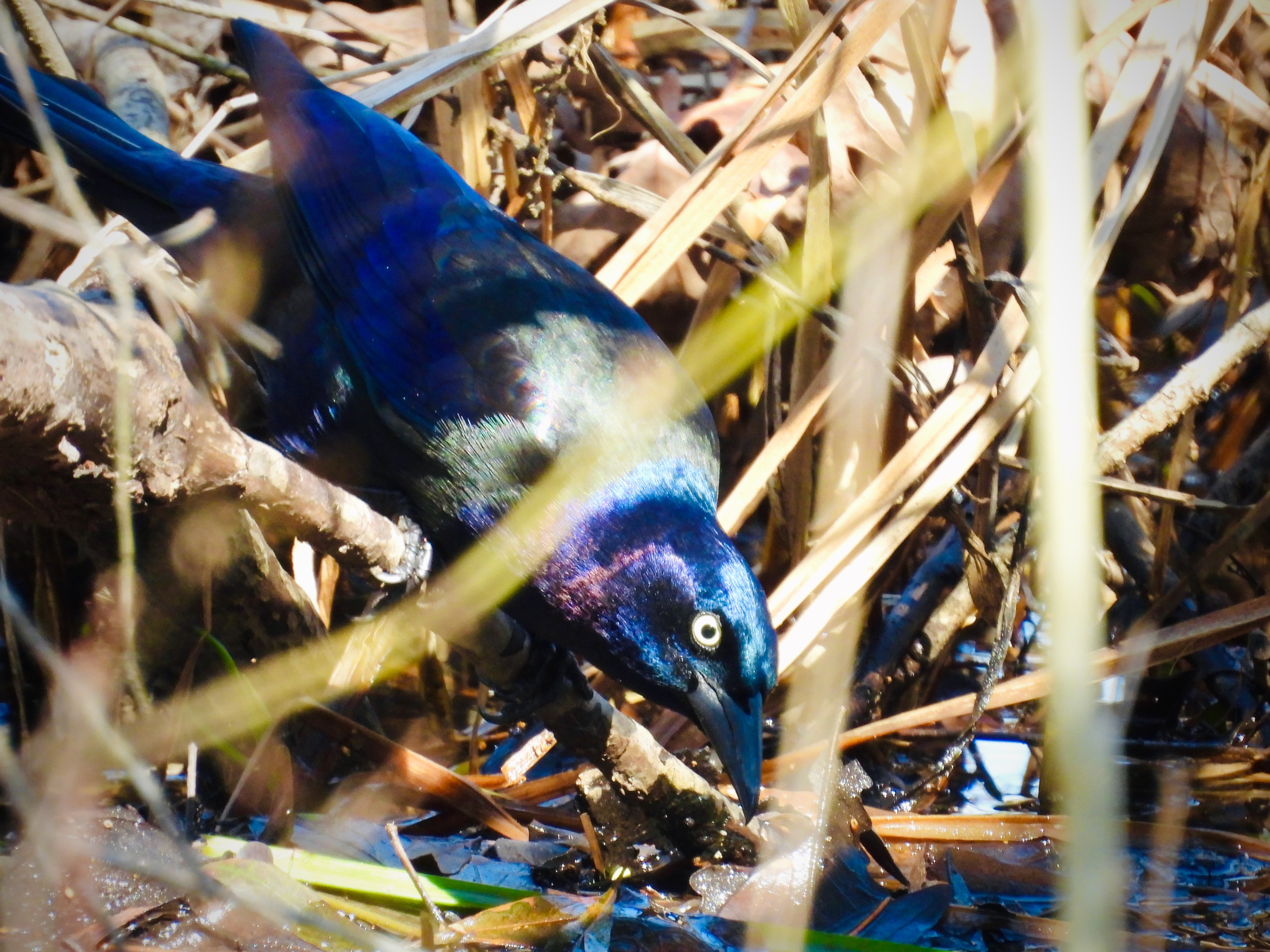
Grackle foraging in a shallow stream; full rainbows are visible in its iridescent feathers.

Common grackle

Adult common grackles measure from 28 to 34 cm (11 to 13 in) in length, span 36–46 cm (14–18 in) across the wings, and weigh 74–142 g (2.6–5.0 oz). Common grackles are less sexually dimorphic than larger grackle species, but the differences between the sexes can still be noticeable. The male, which averages 122 g (4.3 oz), is larger than the female, at an average of 94 g (3.3 oz). Adults have a long, dark bill, pale yellowish eyes, and a long tail; their feathers appear black with purple, green, or blue iridescence on the head, and primarily bronze sheen in the body plumage. Adult females, beyond being smaller, are usually less iridescent; their tails in particular are shorter, and unlike the males, do not keel (display a longitudinal ridge) in flight and are brown with no purple or blue gloss. Juveniles are brown with dark brown eyes.

When grackles are in a group, they are referred to as a "plague".

== Distribution and habitat ==
The breeding habitat is open and semiopen areas across North America east of the Rocky Mountains. The nest is a well-concealed cup in dense trees (particularly pine) or shrubs, usually near water; sometimes, the common grackle nests in cavities or in man-made structures. It often nests in colonies, some being quite large. Bird houses are also a suitable nesting site. Four to seven eggs are in a clutch.

This bird is a permanent resident in much of its range. Northern birds migrate in flocks to the Southeastern United States. The distribution of the common grackle is largely explained by annual mean temperature, and the species has expanded its range by greater than three-fold since the last glacial maximum, approximately 22,000 years ago.

They are particularly found and comfortable in suburban parks and lawns.

== Ecology and behavior ==
=== Foraging and diet ===
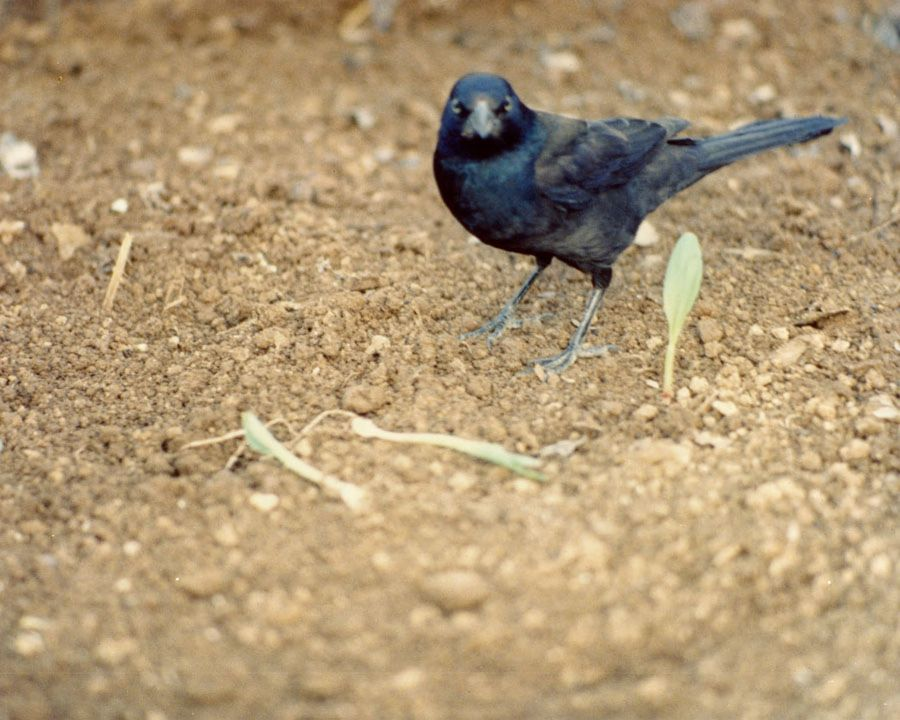
Grackle close up, standing by intact and pulled corn sprouts. Common grackles damage corn by pulling up newly sprouted plants.

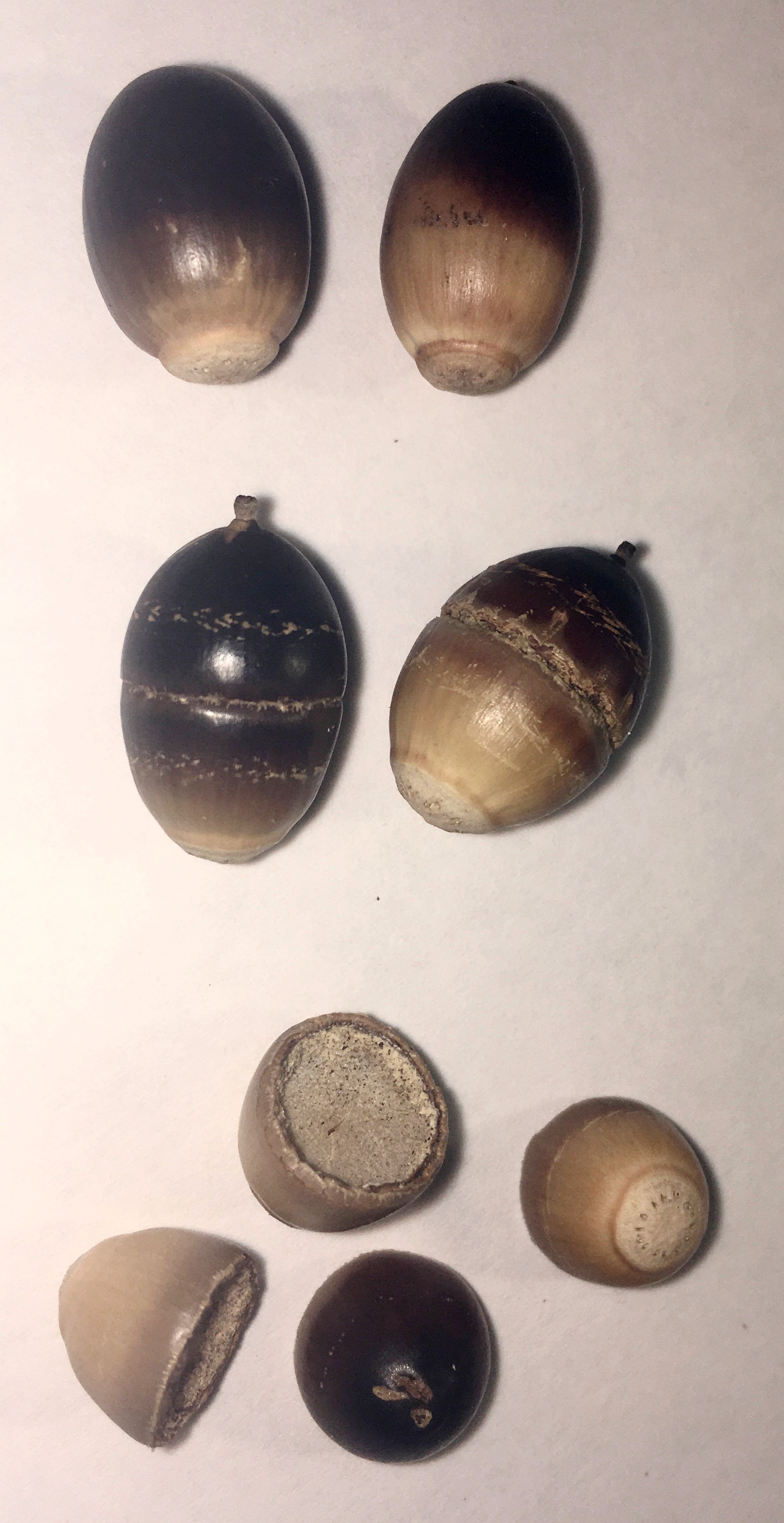
Top: Unmarked live oak acorns. Middle: Acorns scored by common grackles, but dropped before being cracked open. Bottom: Pieces of acorns that have been scored, cracked open, and eaten by common grackles.

The common grackle forages on the ground, in shallow water, or in shrubs; it may steal food from other birds. It is omnivorous, eating insects, minnows, frogs, eggs, berries, seeds, grain, and even small birds and rodents. Grackles at outdoor eating areas often wait eagerly until someone drops some food. They rush forward and try to grab it, often snatching food out of the beak of another bird. Grackles prefer to eat from the ground at bird feeders, making scattered seed an excellent choice of food for them. Grackles can be regularly seen foraging for insects, especially after a lawn trimming.

Grackles have a unique adaptation in the keel within their bill which allows them to crack and cut hard nuts or kernels. The keel projects downward from the horny palate and is sharper and more abrupt anterior. It extends below the level of the tomium and is used in a sawing motion to score open acorns or dried kernels. Larger adductor muscles within their jaw compared to those of other icterids make this adaptation even more useful for opening hard seeds and acorns.

Along with some other species of grackles, the common grackle is known to practice "anting", rubbing insects on its feathers possibly to apply liquids such as formic acid secreted by the insects.

=== Vocals ===
The grackle's song is particularly harsh, especially when these birds, in a flock, are calling. Songs vary from year-round chewink chewink to a more complex breeding season ooo whew, whew, whew, whew, whew call that gets faster and faster and ends with a loud crewhewwhew! It also occasionally sounds like a power line buzzing. The grackle can also mimic the sounds of other birds or even humans, though not as precisely as the mockingbird, which is known to share its habitat in the Southeastern United States.

Call

=== Breeding ===
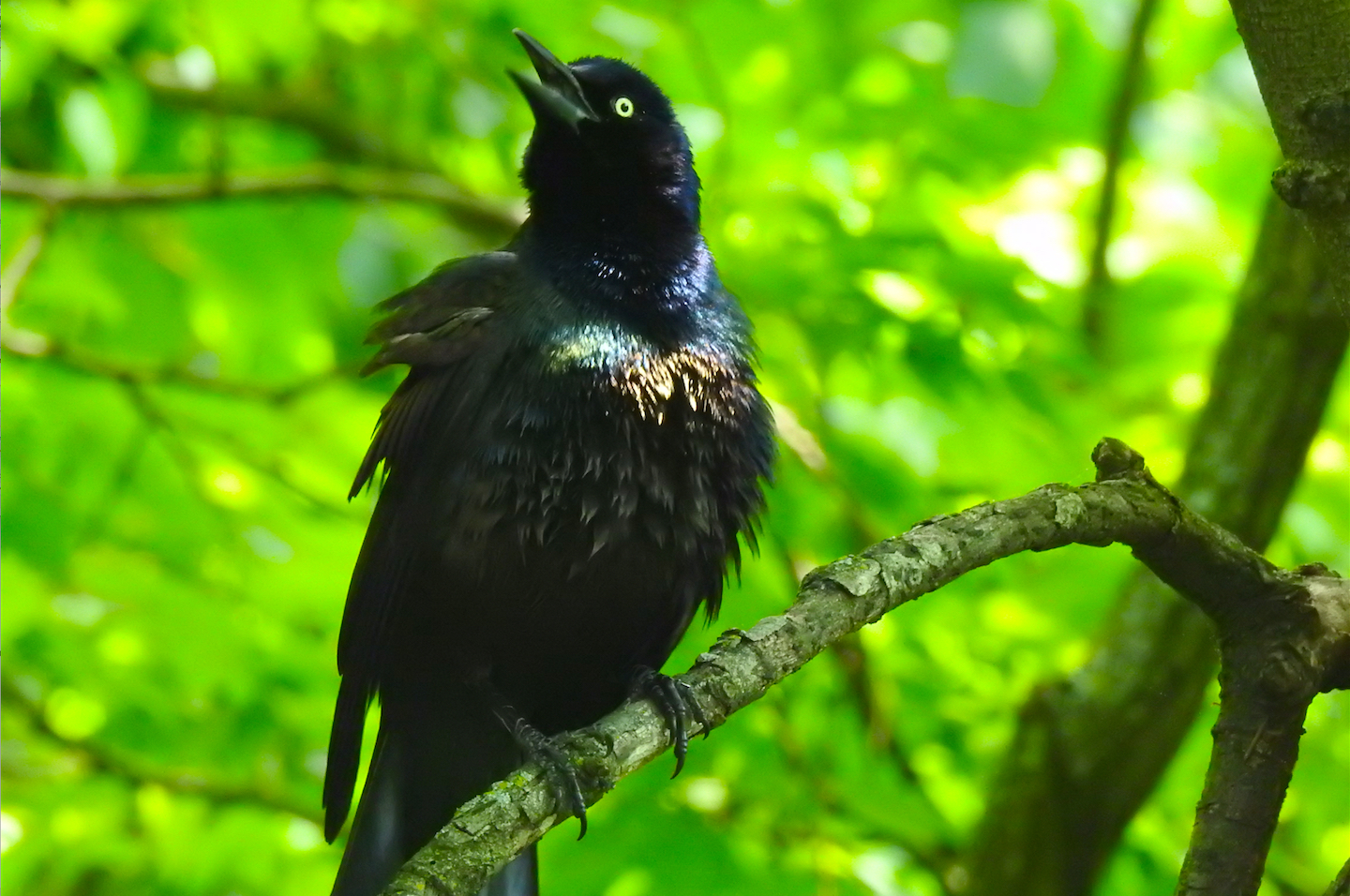
Common grackle, mating display in Central Park, New York

In the breeding season, males tip their heads back and fluff up feathers to display and keep other males away. This same behavior is used as a defensive posture to attempt to intimidate predators. Male common grackles are less aggressive toward one another, and more cooperative and social, than the larger boat-tailed grackle species.

== Relationship with humans ==
The range of this bird expanded west as forests were cleared. In some areas, it is now considered a pest by farmers because of its large numbers and fondness for grain. Despite a currently robust population, a 2011 study by the National Audubon Society of data from the Christmas Bird Count indicated that populations had declined by 61% to a population of 73 million from historic highs of over 190 million birds. As a result, it is now classified by the IUCN as Near Threatened.

Unlike many birds, the common grackle benefits from the expansion of human populations due to its resourceful and opportunistic nature. Common grackles are considered to be a serious threat to crops by some, and are notoriously difficult to control; this usually requires the use of hawks or similar large birds of prey.

== Proposed magnetoreceptivity ==
Though the exact mechanism is poorly understood, one study examined the ability of the common grackle to interpret the Earth's magnetic field—or in this case, the variability of it. The common grackle (like most of its Quiscalus relatives) was found to be attuned to a dynamic magnetic field to a scientifically significant degree.

== Gallery ==
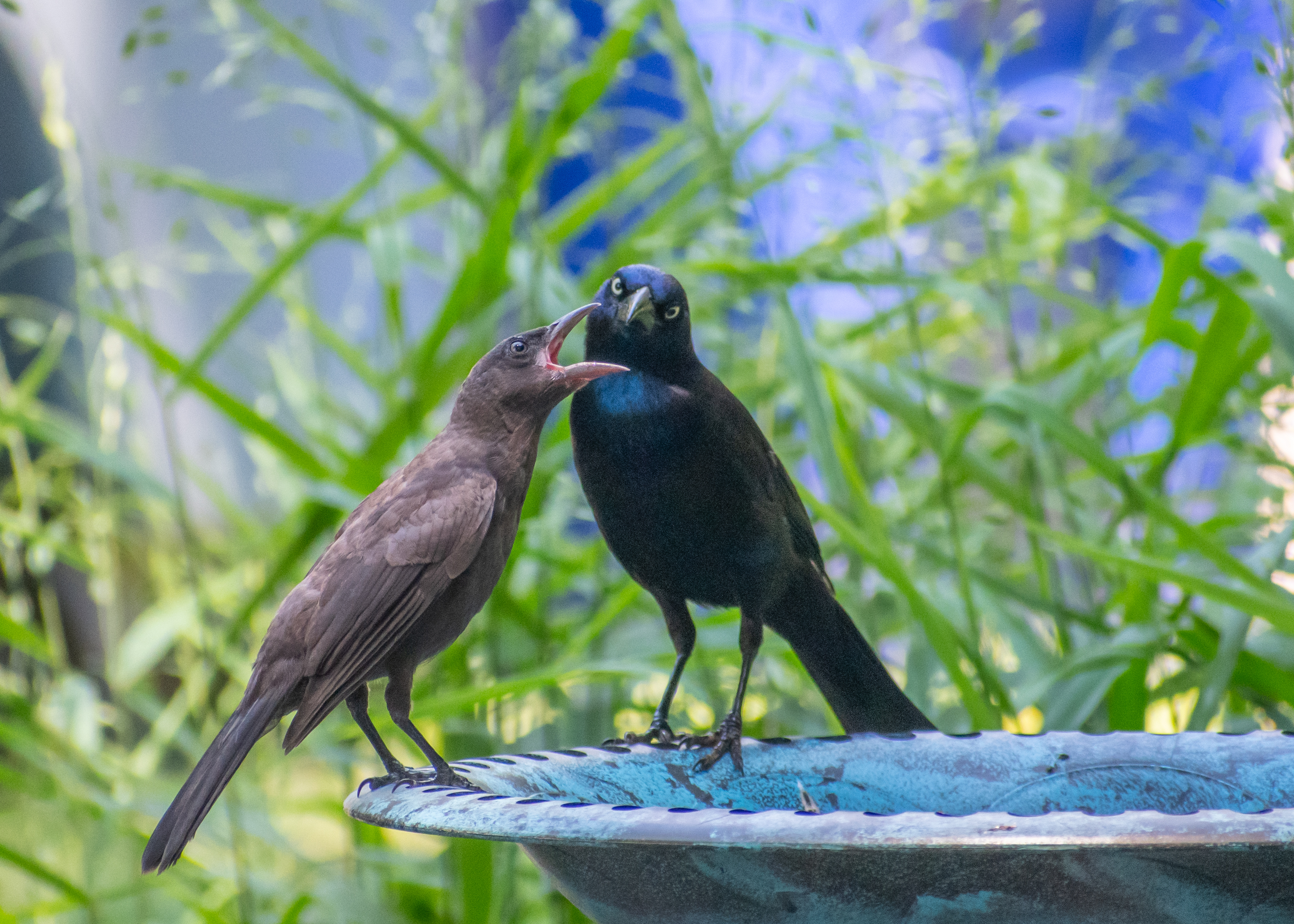
Juvenile and adult together

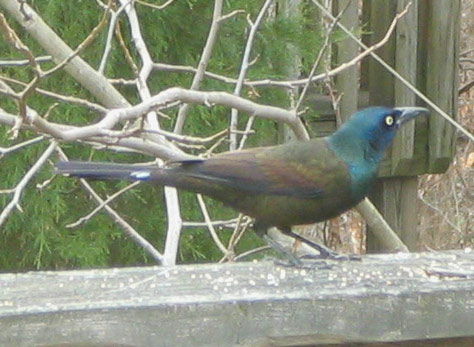
Iridescent back and head

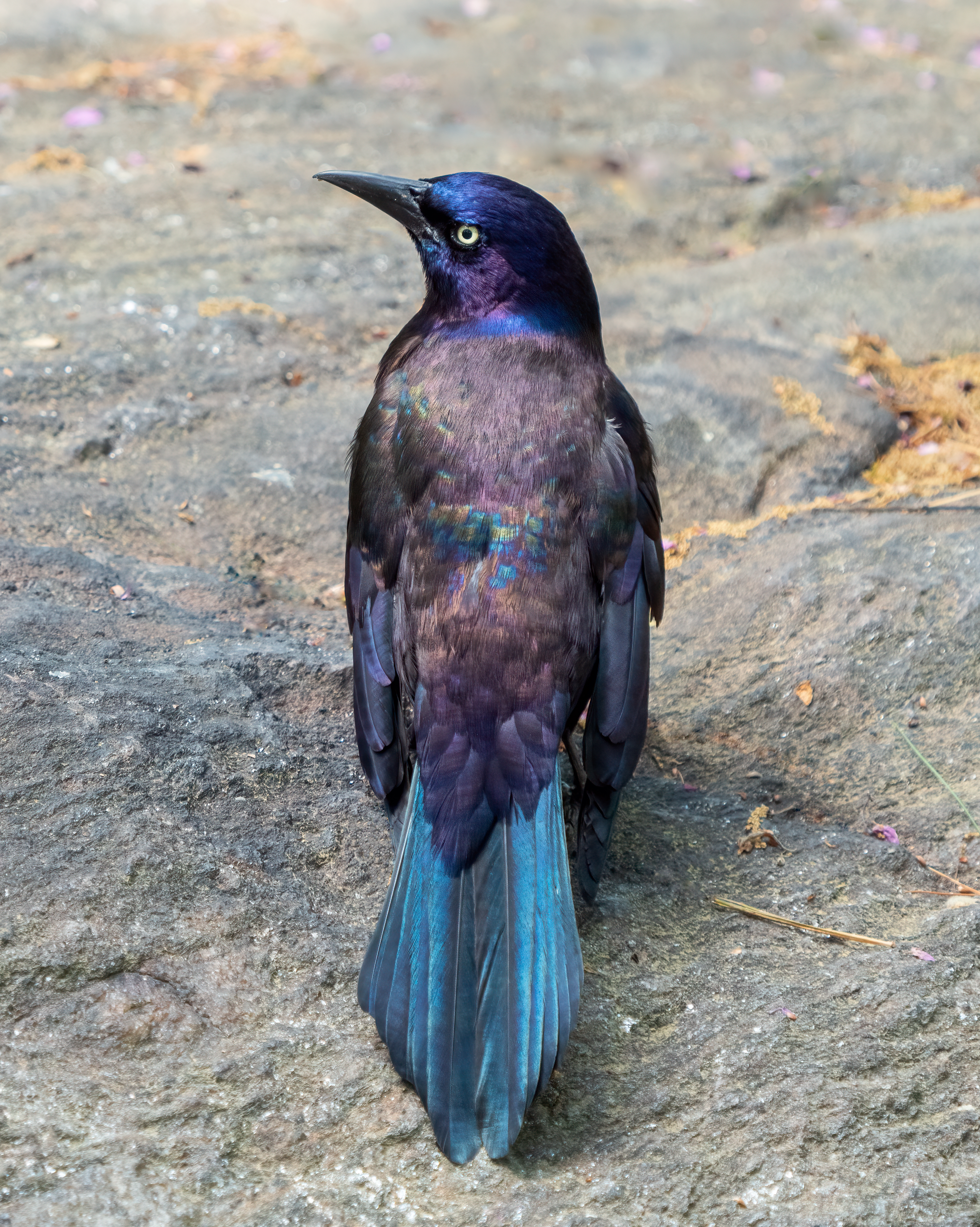
Iridescence of the grackle's feathers

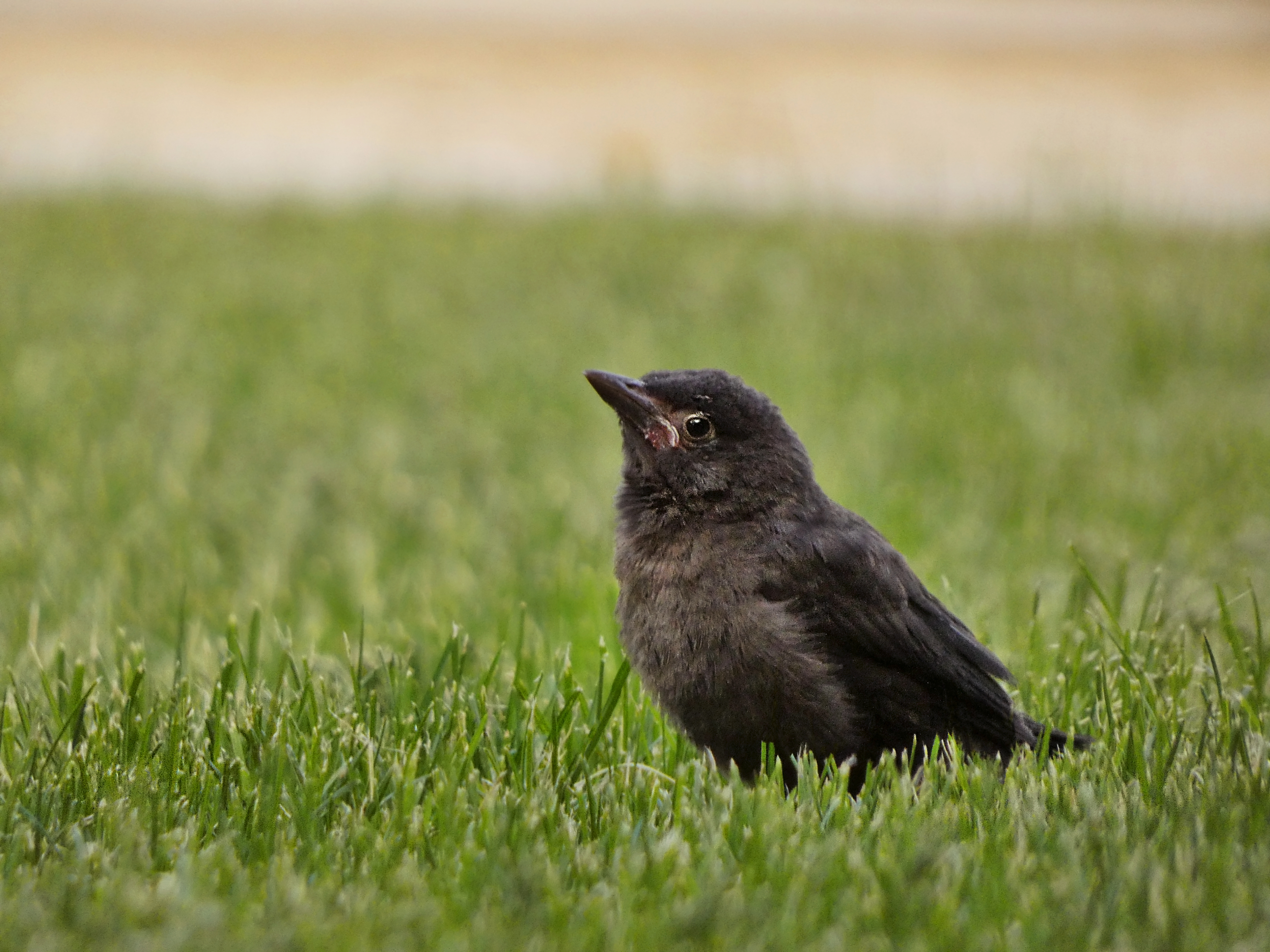
A juvenile common grackle stands in freshly cut grass

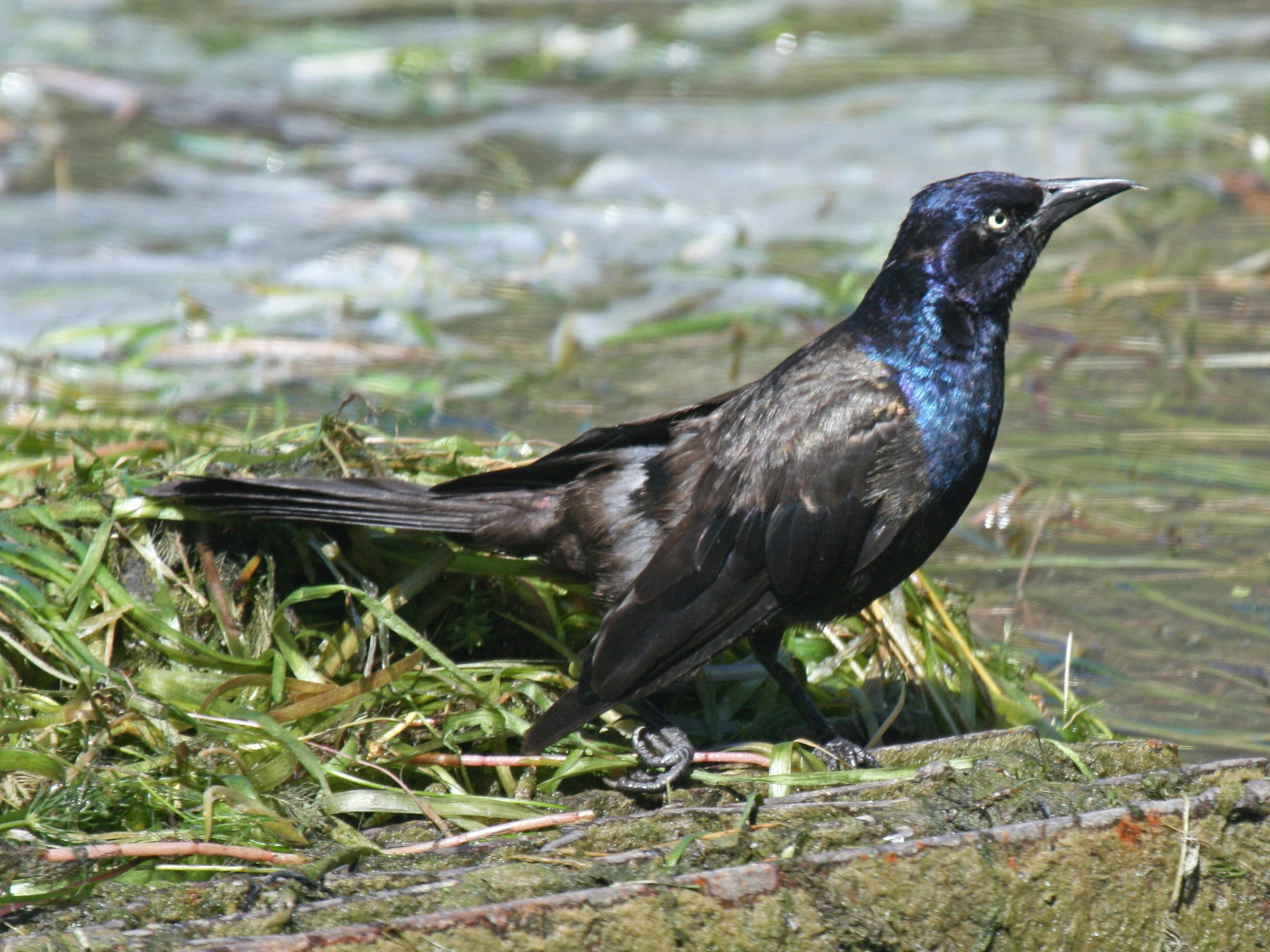
Iridescent male common grackle

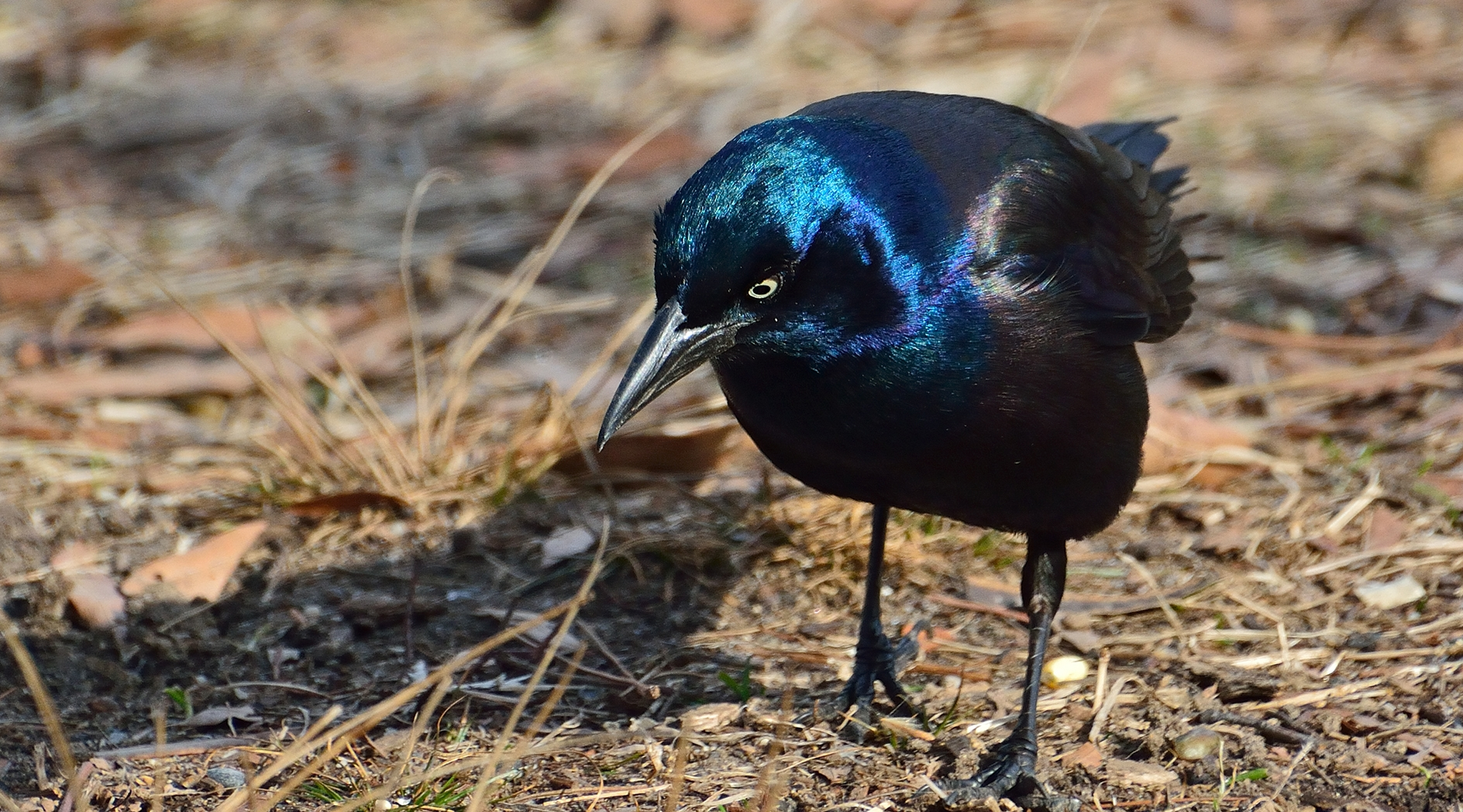
Common grackle in Central Park

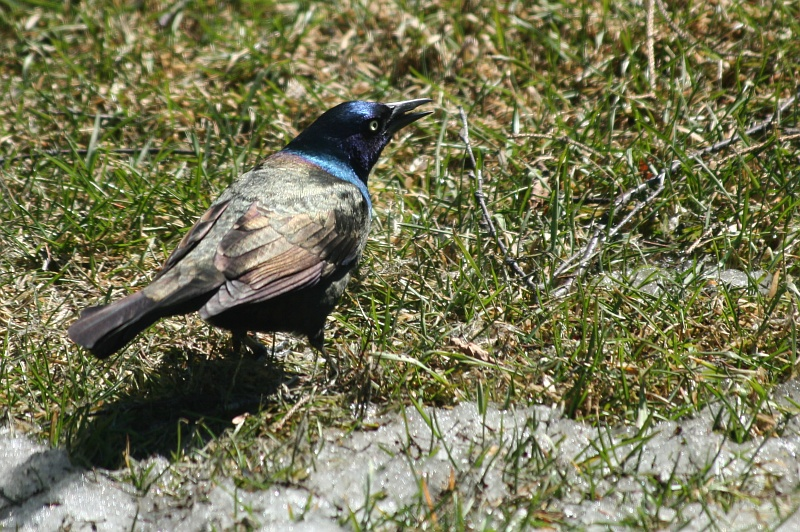
Iridescence in direct sunlight

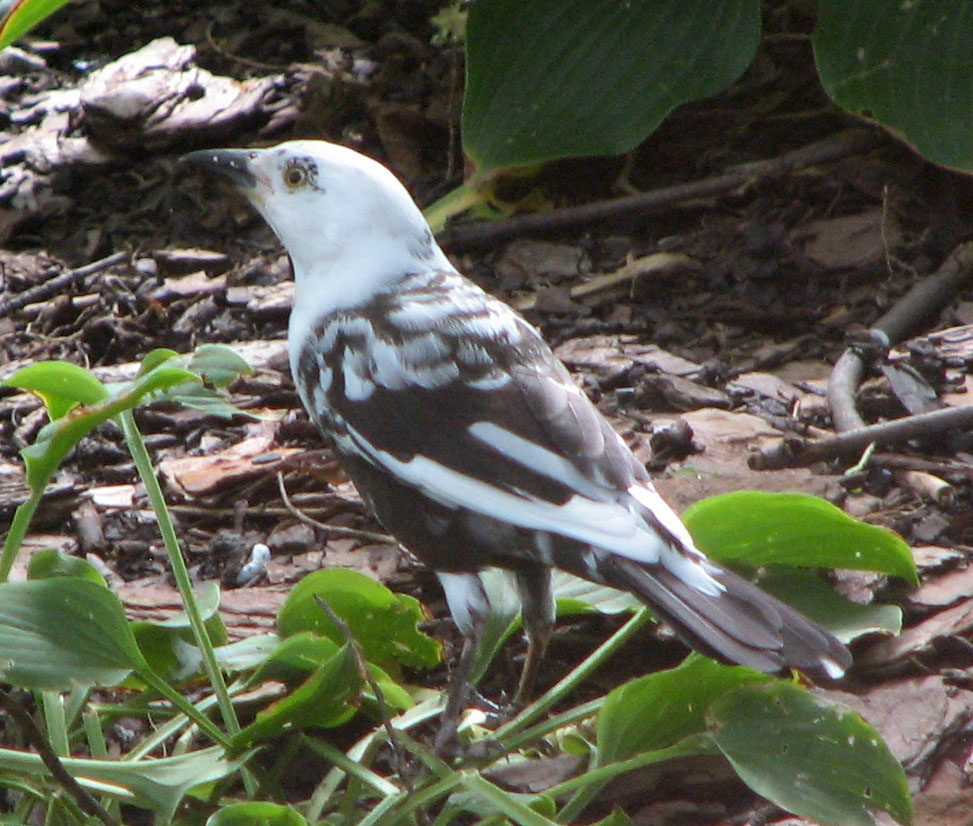
Partially leucistic/piebald

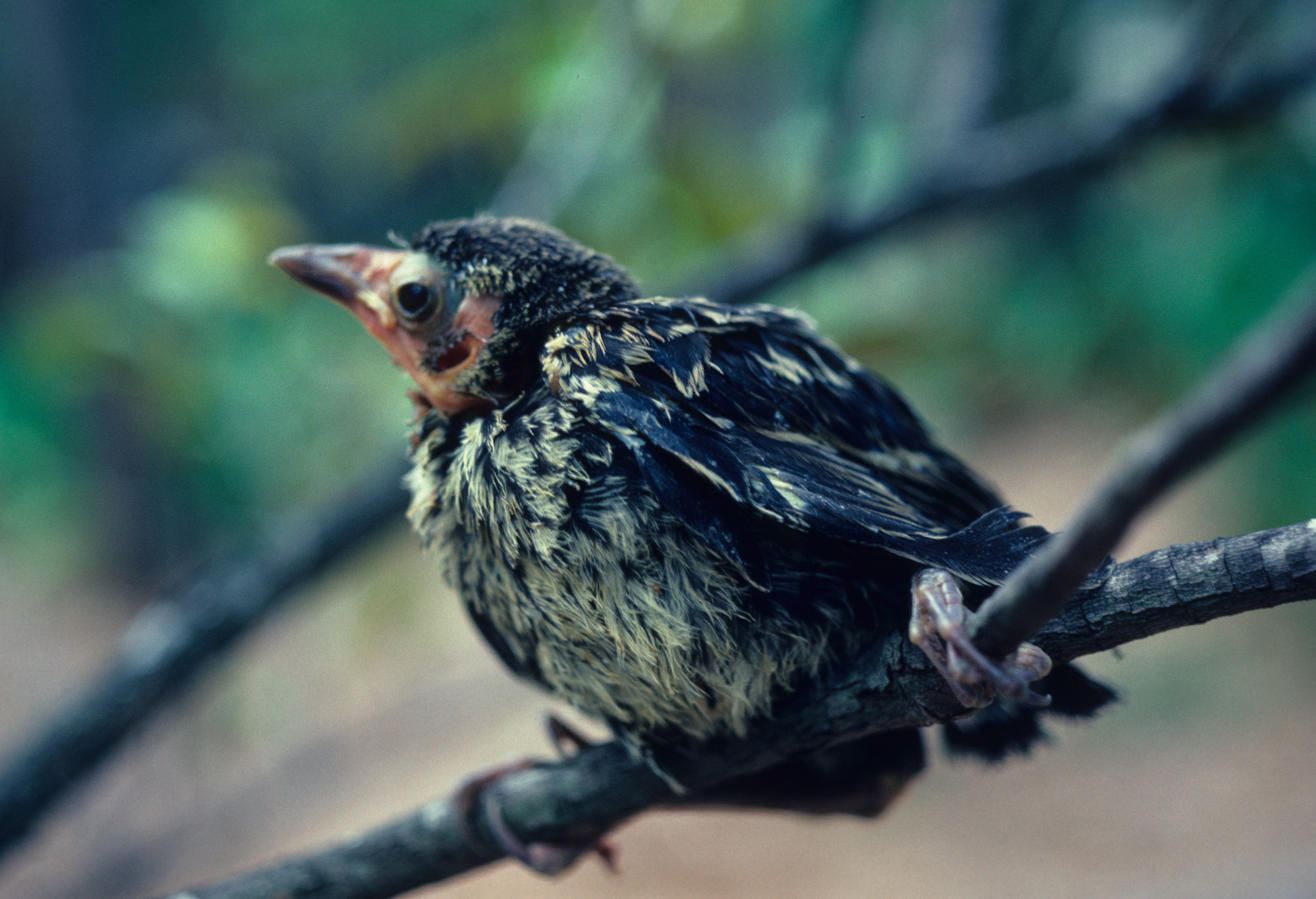
Chick

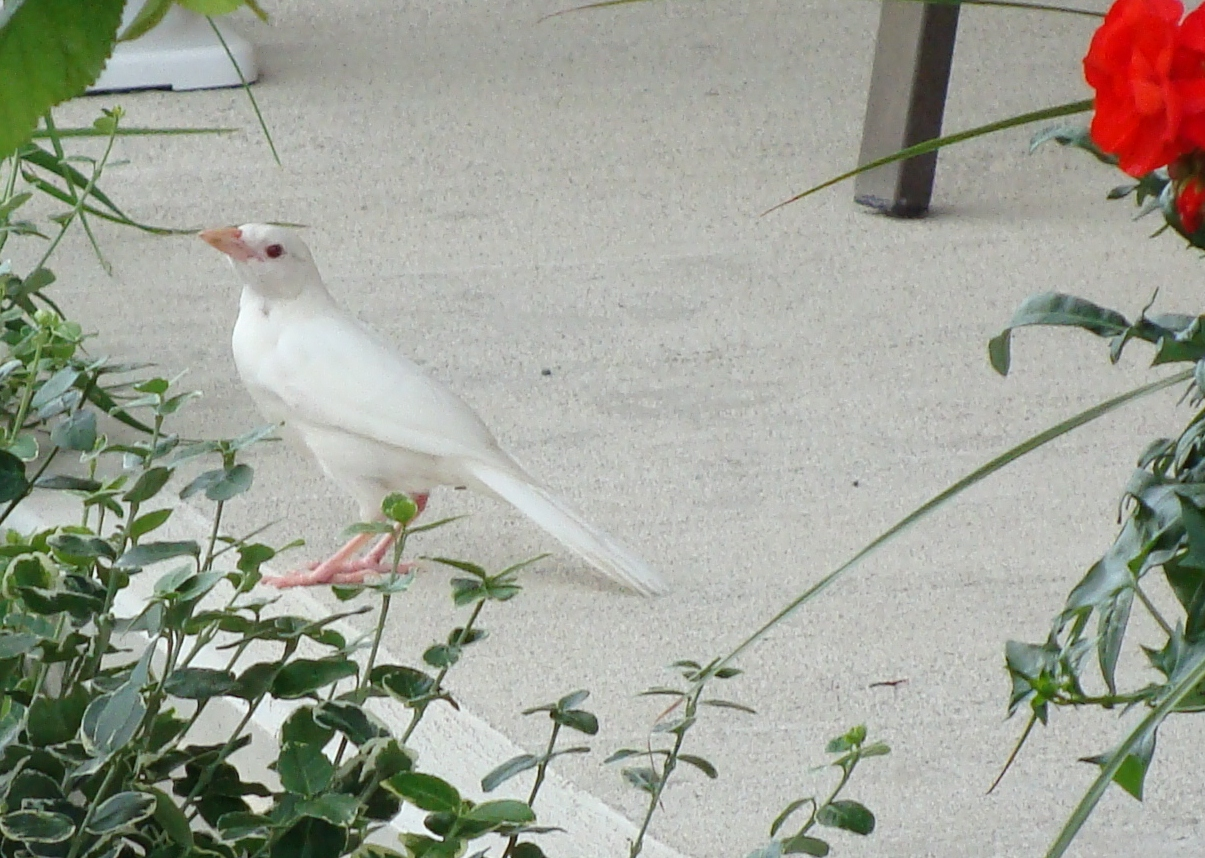
An albino grackle in Peterborough, Ontario

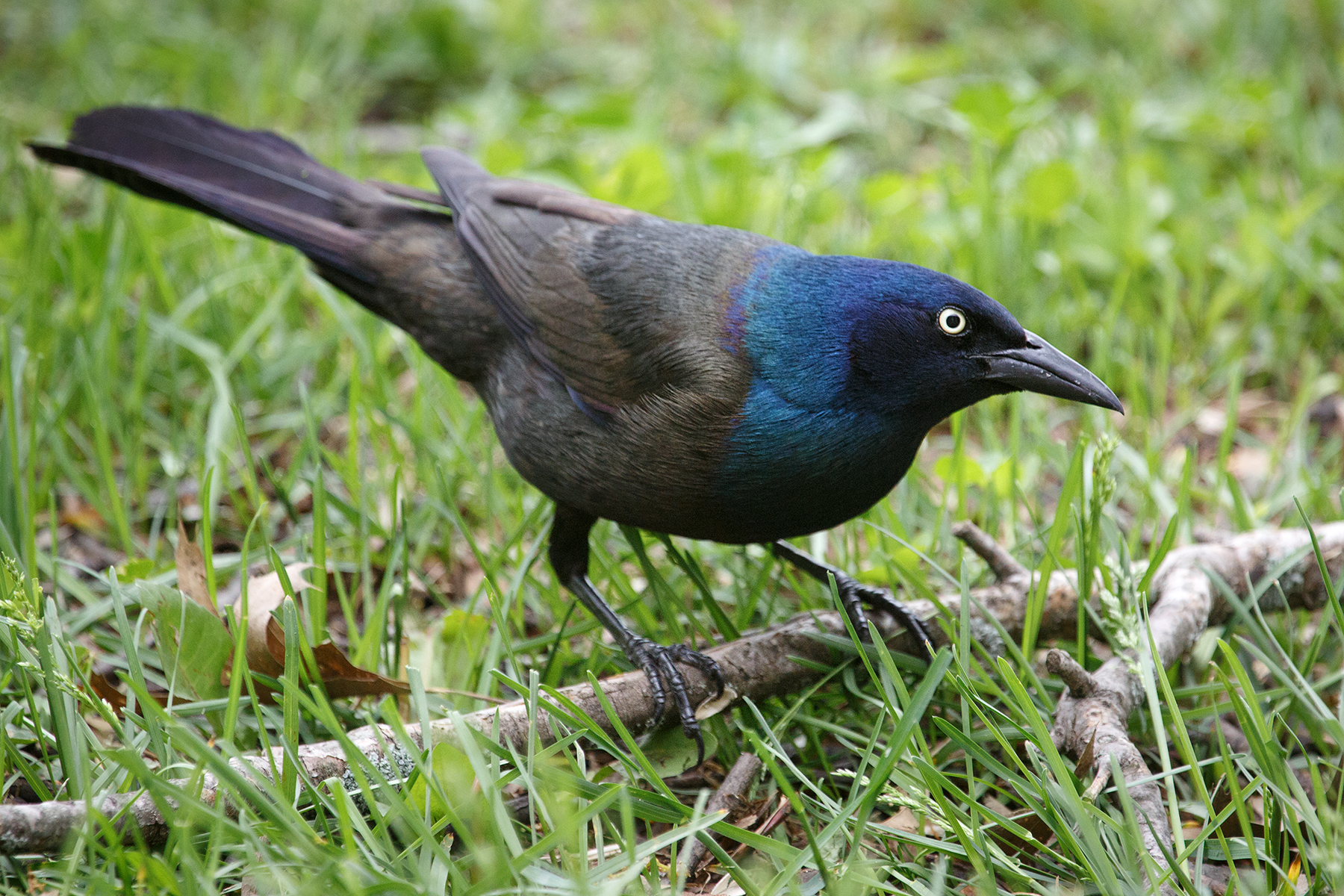
Male feeding in grass

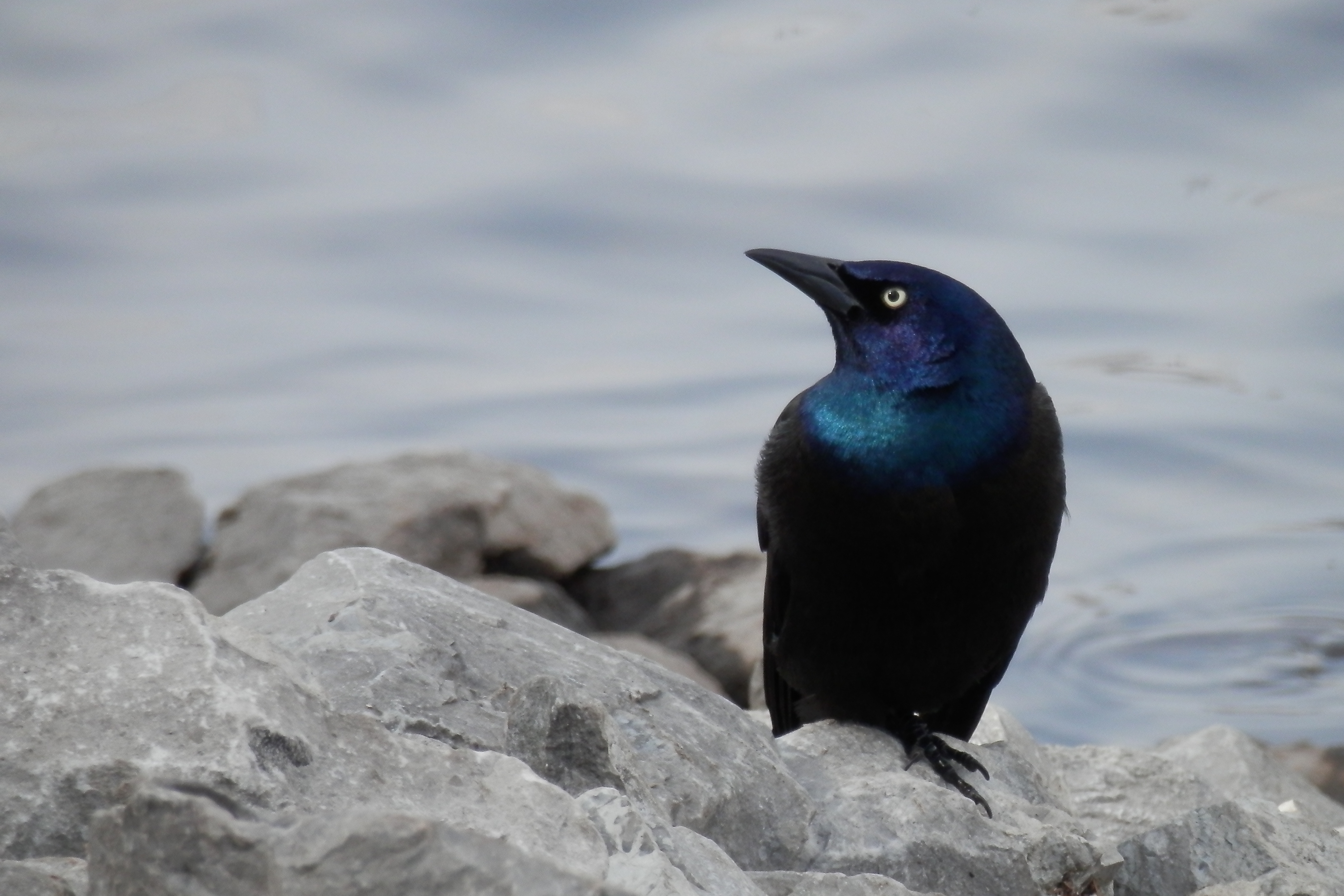
In Ontario, Canada

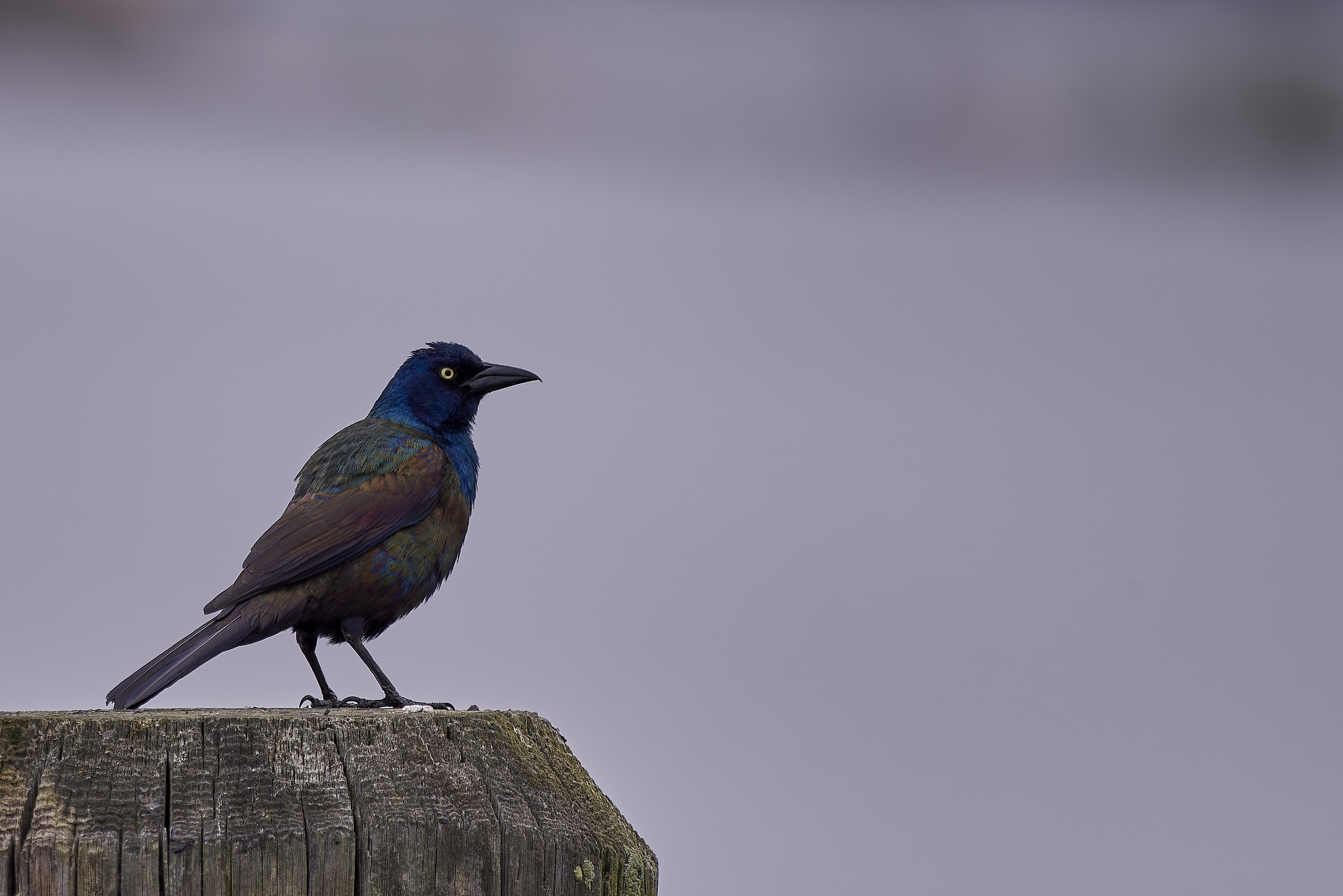
Common grackle on a wood piling, Connecticut River
