= Plasmodium paranucleophilum =

Scientific classification
- Domain: Eukaryota
- Clade: Sar
- Clade: Alveolata
- Phylum: Apicomplexa
- Class: Aconoidasida
- Order: Haemospororida
- Family: Plasmodiidae
- Genus: Plasmodium
- Species: P. paranucleophilum

Binomial name
- Plasmodium paranucleophilum Manwell and Sessler, 1971

Species of single-celled organism

Plasmodium paranucleophilum is a parasite of the genus Plasmodium subgenus Novyella. As in all Plasmodium species, P. paranucleophilum has both vertebrate and insect hosts. The vertebrate hosts for this parasite are birds.

== Taxonomy ==
The parasite was first described by Manwell and Sessler in 1971.

== Distribution ==
This species was described in South America.

== Hosts ==
The only known host is a tanager (Tachyphonus species).
