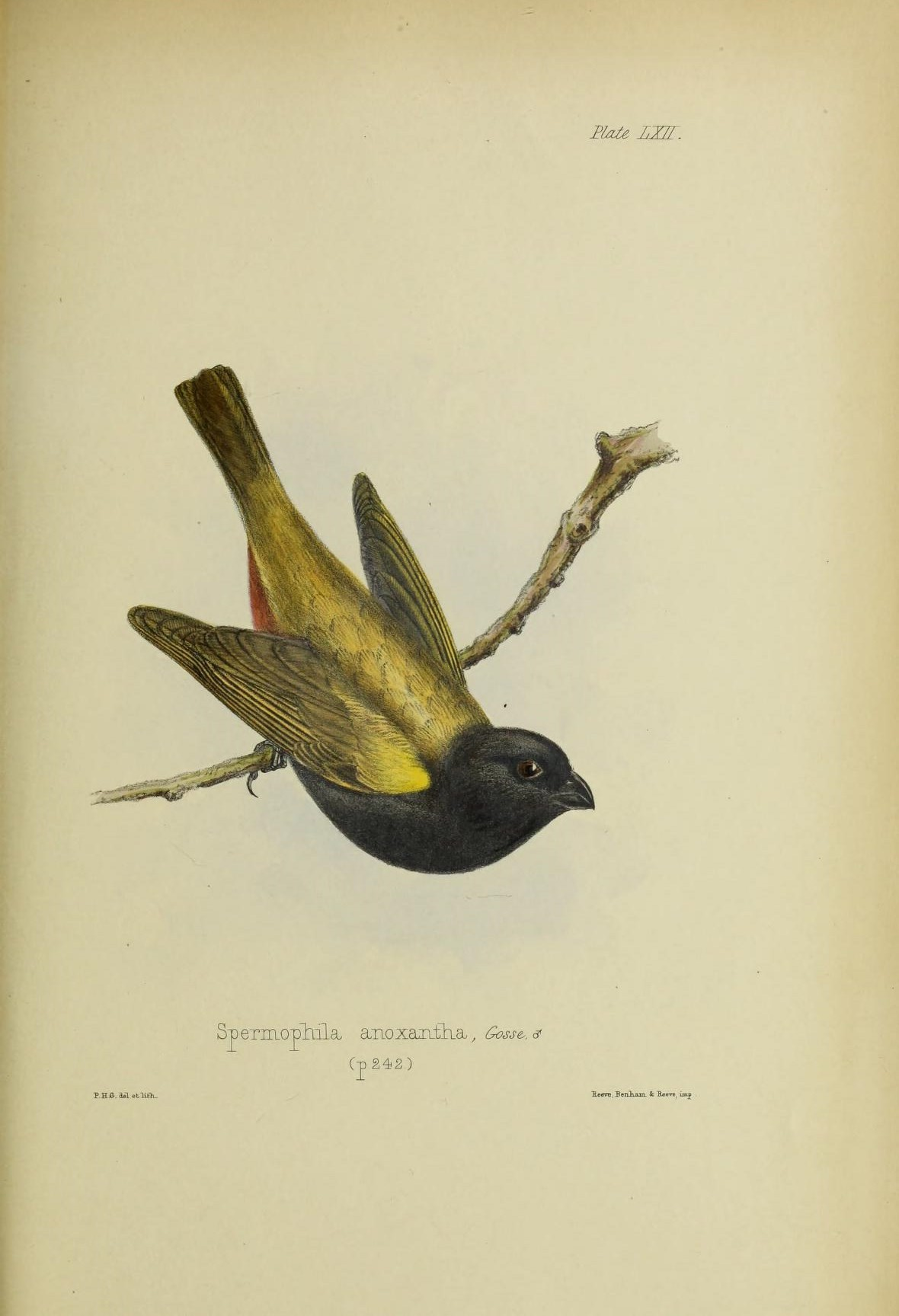

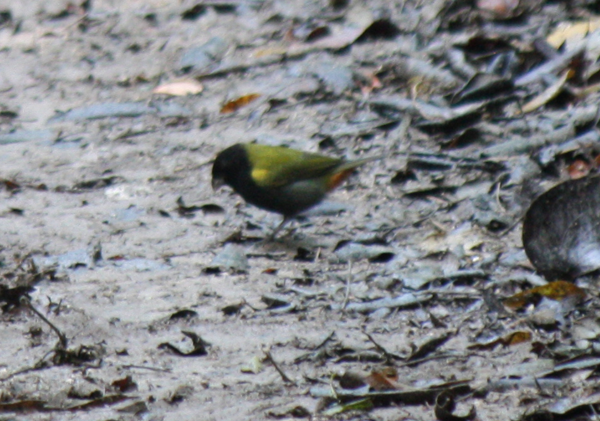

Conservation status
- Least Concern (IUCN 3.1)

Scientific classification
- Kingdom: Animalia
- Phylum: Chordata
- Class: Aves
- Order: Passeriformes
- Family: Thraupidae
- Genus: Loxipasser; Bryant, 1866
- Species: L. anoxanthus

Binomial name
- Loxipasser anoxanthus (Gosse, 1847)
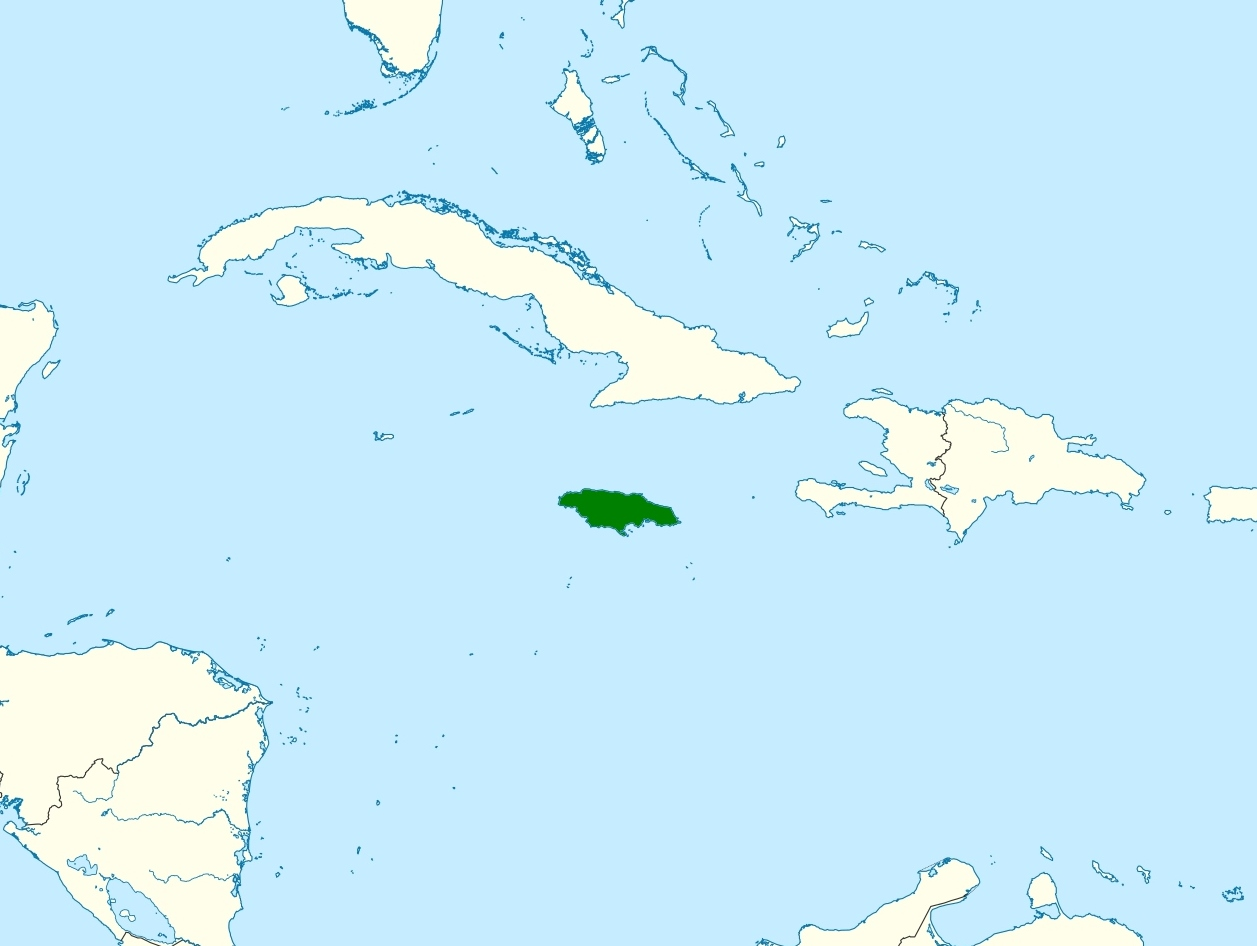

Synonyms
- Spermophila anoxantha (protonym)

= Yellow-shouldered grassquit =

Species of bird in the family Thraupidae

The yellow-shouldered grassquit (Loxipasser anoxanthus) is a species of bird in the family Thraupidae, the tanagers and allies. It is endemic to Jamaica.

== Taxonomy and systematics ==
The yellow-shouldered grassquit was formally described in 1847 by the English naturalist Philip Henry Gosse as the "Yellow-back finch" in his book The Birds of Jamaica. Gosse coined the binomial name Spermophila anoxantha. The naturalist Henry Bryant erected Loxipasser for it in 1866. The genus name combines the word Loxia introduced by Carl Linnaeus in 1758 for the crossbills with Passer introduced by Mathurin Jacques Brisson in 1760 for the sparrows. The specific epithet anoxanthus is formed from the Ancient Greek anō meaning "above" or "upperparts" with xanthos meaning "yellow". Although the yellow-shouldered grassquit was traditionally placed with the buntings and New World sparrows in the family Emberizidae, molecular phylogenetic studies have shown that this species is a member of the subfamily Coerebinae within the tanager family Thraupidae.

The yellow-shouldered grassquit is the only member of its genus and has no subspecies.

== Description ==
The yellow-shouldered grassquit is 10 to 11.5 cm (3.9 to 4.5 in) long and weighs 10.5 to 12.5 g (0.37 to 0.44 oz). It is a small bird with a disproportionately large head and a thick bill with a strongly curved culmen. The species is sexually dimorphic. Adult males have a black head, neck, throat, and breast. Their mantle, back, rump, and tail are grass-green. Their wings are greenish with the eponymous yellow shoulder. Their belly and flanks are greenish and their crissum rusty. Adult females have a gray head and breast with a faint green wash. Their upperparts are greenish with a yellow wash and their wings greenish with a yellow shoulder. Their belly is grayish green and their crissum a paler rusty than the male's. Both sexes have a dark iris, a horn-colored bill, and blackish legs and feet.

== Distribution and habitat ==
The yellow-shouldered grassquit is found throughout Jamaica. It primarily inhabits the edges of dry to wet forest types and also woodlands and gardens near forest. Sources differ on its upper elevational limit. One says it is found at all elevations but another says it reaches only 1,800 m (5,900 ft).

== Behavior ==
=== Movement ===
The yellow-shouldered grassquit is a sedentary year-round resident.

=== Feeding ===
The yellow-shouldered grassquit's diet has not been studied but is known to include seeds and fruits and assumed to also include insects. It forages in pairs and family groups near the ground in bushes and trees.

=== Breeding ===
The yellow-shouldered grassquit breeds between March and September. Its nest is a dome woven from grass and down with a side entrance. It is typically in a bush or tree and may also be concealed in an epiphyte. The clutch is three or four eggs that are white with reddish or brown markings. Nothing else is known about the species' breeding biology.

=== Vocalization ===
The yellow-shouldered grassquit's song is "5 descending notes, with an almost echo-like quality".

== Status ==
The IUCN has assessed the yellow-shouldered grassquit as being of Least Concern. It has a limited range; its population size is not known but is believed to be stable. No immediate threats have been identified. It is considered "fairly common and widespread".
