= Plasmodium ashfordi =

Scientific classification
- Domain: Eukaryota
- Clade: Sar
- Clade: Alveolata
- Phylum: Apicomplexa
- Class: Aconoidasida
- Order: Haemospororida
- Family: Plasmodiidae
- Genus: Plasmodium
- Subgenus: Papernaia
- Species: P. ashfordi

Binomial name
- Plasmodium ashfordi Valkiunas et al. 2007

Species of single-celled organism

Plasmodium ashfordi is a species of the genus Plasmodium subgenus Papernaia.

Like all species in this genus it has both vertebrate and insect hosts. The vertebrate host are birds.

== Description ==
This species was first described in 2007 by Valkiunas et al.

The parasite infects erythrocytes.

== Geographical location ==
This species is found in Europe and probably in Africa.

== Clinical features and pathological effects ==
The organism was isolated from great reed warblers (Acrocephalus arundinaceus). Videvall et al., 2015 study the course of gene transcription in hosts (in this case Spinus spinus). They find differences between uninfected, infected and rising parasitemia, and infection past the peak. Besides immunological expression they find transcription of cell death and stress response factors. However note that Scalf et al., 2019 finds this to be a difficult method to use in a related species, Taeniopygia guttata, because different tissues transcribe different genes even in the same individual and under the same challenge.
