= Plasmodium pinotti =

Scientific classification
- Domain: Eukaryota
- Clade: Sar
- Clade: Alveolata
- Phylum: Apicomplexa
- Class: Aconoidasida
- Order: Haemospororida
- Family: Plasmodiidae
- Genus: Plasmodium
- Species: P. pinotti

Binomial name
- Plasmodium pinotti Muniz and Soares, 1954

Species of single-celled organism

Plasmodium pinotti is a parasite of the genus Plasmodium subgenus Giovannolaia.

Like all Plasmodium species P. pinotti has both vertebrate and insect hosts. The vertebrate hosts for this parasite are birds.

== Description ==
The parasite was first described by Muniz and Soares in 1954. It was named after Mario Pinotti.

== Geographical occurrence ==
This species is found in Jamaica.

== Clinical features and host pathology ==
Known hosts of this species include the bananaquit (Coereba flaveola), orangequit (Euneornis campestris), yellow-shouldered grassquit (Loxipasser anoxanthus), large toucan (Ramphastos toco) and black-faced grassquit (Tiaris bicolor).
