= Culiseta morsitans =

Scientific classification
- Kingdom: Animalia
- Phylum: Arthropoda
- Clade: Pancrustacea
- Class: Insecta
- Order: Diptera
- Family: Culicidae
- Genus: Culiseta
- Species: C. morsitans

Binomial name
- Culiseta morsitans Theobald, 1901

Species of fly

Culiseta morsitans is a species of mosquito in the family Culicidae.

== Description ==
Culiseta morsitans is considered univoltine, producing one generation per year. However, females are long-lived and can appear in light trap collections well into the summer months. Eggs are known to be able to overwinter.

== Biology ==
Culiseta morsitans is considered univoltine, producing a single generation per year, with its eggs serving as the primary overwintering stage. Larvae typically hatch in mid-to-late spring and develop within semi-permanent or permanent woodland swamps and marshes containing dense vegetation.

== Distribution ==
Culiseta morsitans is common in New England and upper New York State. Its distribution spans south-central Canada, including provinces such as Alberta, British Columbia, Manitoba, and Nova Scotia. The species thrives in colder climates and is adapted to northern environments.

== Medical importance ==
Adult females are blood feeders that primarily seek avian hosts for their blood meals. There have been records that Culiseta morsitans can act as a vector of Eastern equine encephalitis virus.
