= Giovannolaia =

Scientific classification
- Domain: Eukaryota
- Clade: Diaphoretickes
- Clade: SAR
- Clade: Alveolata
- Phylum: Apicomplexa
- Class: Aconoidasida
- Order: Haemospororida
- Family: Plasmodiidae
- Genus: Plasmodium
- Subgenus: Giovannolaia; Corradetti et al., 1963

Species
- See text

Subgenus of single-celled organisms

Giovanolaia is a subgenus of the genus Plasmodium created by Corradetti et al. in 1963. The parasites within this subgenus infect birds.

This subgenus was shown on the basis of DNA analysis to be polyphyletic. This is unsurprising – it has been a wastebasket taxon. A revision of this subgenus on a morphological basis by Landau et al. moved several of the species in this subgenus into a new subgenus Papernaia.

== Description ==
Species in the subgenus Giovanolaia have the following characteristics:

Schizonts contain plentiful cytoplasm, are larger than the host cell nucleus and frequently displace it. They are found only in mature erythrocytes.

Gametocytes are elongated.

Both gametocytes and schizonts are stretched along the red cell nucleus.

Exoerythrocytic schizogony occurs in the mononuclear phagocyte system.

== Species in this subgenus ==
- Plasmodium anasum
- Plasmodium buteonis
- Plasmodium circumflexum – type species
- Plasmodium dissanaikei
- Plasmodium fallax
- Plasmodium ghadiriani
- Plasmodium gundersi
- Plasmodium heroni
- Plasmodium lophurae
- Plasmodium octamerium
- Plasmodium tranieri
