= Plasmodium circumflexum =

Scientific classification
- Domain: Eukaryota
- Clade: Sar
- Clade: Alveolata
- Phylum: Apicomplexa
- Class: Aconoidasida
- Order: Haemospororida
- Family: Plasmodiidae
- Genus: Plasmodium
- Species: P. circumflexum

Binomial name
- Plasmodium circumflexum Kikuth, 1931

Species of single-celled organism

Plasmodium circumflexum is a parasite of the genus Plasmodium subgenus Giovannolaia.

Like all Plasmodium species P. circumflexum has both vertebrate and insect hosts. The vertebrate hosts for this parasite are birds.

== Taxonomy ==
The parasite was first described by Kikuth in 1931 in a juniper thrush. It may have been the same species previous described by Labbe in 1894 who thought it was a species of Haemoproteus.

== Description ==
Schizonts: these are large and when mature may entirely encircle the erythrocyte nucleus.

Merozoites: each schizont gives rise to 13-30 merozoites (mean 19.8: standard deviation 5).

Gametocytes: these are large and when mature may entirely encircle the erythrocyte nucleus.

== Distribution ==
This parasite is found in Argentina, Brazil, Canada, Germany, Italy, Malaysia, Morocco, South Africa, Sri Lanka and the United States.

== Vectors ==
Culiseta morsitans

Mansonia crassipes

Theobaldia annulata

Sporogeny but not transmission has been recorded in Mansonia perturbans.

== Hosts ==
P. circumflexum has been recorded infecting the following hosts:

- Shikra (Accipiter badius)
- Eurasian Sparrowhawk (Accipiter nisus)
- Sharp-shinned hawk (Accipiter striatus),
- Red-winged blackbird (Agelaius phoeniceus),
- Wood duck (Aix sponsa),
- Canvasbacks (Aythya valisineria),
- Blue jay (Cyanocitta cristata),
- Cape May warbler (Dendroica tigrina),
- Gray cat bird (Dumella carolinensis),
- Slate colour junicao (Junico hymenalis),
- Song sparrow (Melospiza melodia),
- Common merganser (Mergus merganser),
- Cowbird (Molothrus ater ater),
- Finch (Richmondena cardinalis cardinalis),
- Trumpeter swan (Olor buccinator),
- Chestnut-tailed starling (Sturnus malabaricus),
- Brown thrasher (Toxostomar ufum),
- White throated sparrow (Tromotrichio albicolis),
- American robin (Turdus migratorius),
- Juniper thrush (Turdus pilaris),
- Wild guineafowl (Numida meleagris) - the pathological features in acute cases include anaemia, jaundice and splenomegaly; in the subacute cases severe splenomegaly, right ventricular hypertrophy and multifocal interstitial myocarditis.
- White throated sparrow (Zonotrichia albicollis)
