= Plasmodium gabaldoni =

Scientific classification
- Domain: Eukaryota
- Clade: Sar
- Clade: Alveolata
- Phylum: Apicomplexa
- Class: Aconoidasida
- Order: Haemospororida
- Family: Plasmodiidae
- Genus: Plasmodium
- Species: P. gabaldoni

Binomial name
- Plasmodium gabaldoni Garnham, 1977

Species of single-celled organism

Plasmodium gabaldoni is a parasite of the genus Plasmodium subgenus Giovannolaia.

Like all Plasmodium species P. gabaldoni has both vertebrate and insect hosts. The vertebrate hosts for this parasite are birds.

== Description ==
The parasite was first described by Garnham in 1977.

== Geographical occurrence ==
This parasite is found in Venezuela.

== Clinical features and host pathology ==
P. gabaldoni infects muscovy ducks (Cairina moschata) and rock pigeons (Columba livia).
