= Plasmodium fallax =

Scientific classification
- Domain: Eukaryota
- Clade: Diaphoretickes
- Clade: SAR
- Clade: Alveolata
- Phylum: Apicomplexa
- Class: Aconoidasida
- Order: Haemospororida
- Family: Plasmodiidae
- Genus: Plasmodium
- Species: P. fallax

Binomial name
- Plasmodium fallax Schwetz, 1930

Species of single-celled organism

Plasmodium fallax is a parasite of the genus Plasmodium subgenus Giovannolaia.

Like all Plasmodium species P. fallax has both vertebrate and insect hosts. The vertebrate hosts for this parasite are birds.

== Taxonomy ==
The parasite was first described by Schwetz in 1930.

== Distribution ==
This species is found in Uganda, Africa.

== Hosts ==
In Uganda a vector has been identified - the mosquito Aedes albopictus.

Among its vertebrate hosts are the pygmy owl (Glaucidium passerinum), turkeys (Meleagris species) and the helmeted guineafowl (Numida meleagris).

Plasmodium fallax has periods in which the parasite leaves its host cell and travels to find a new host cell. This is very risky because the parasite will become inactive and unable to invade a new cell if it does not quickly find a host.
