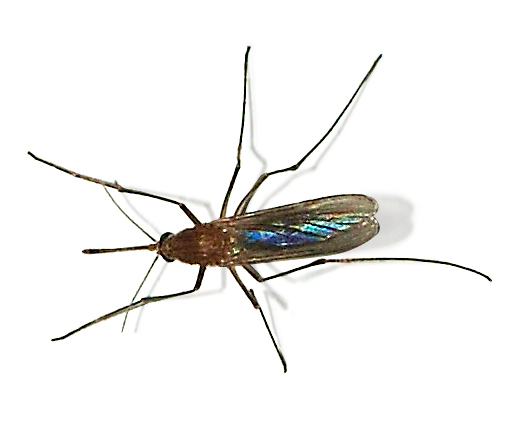

Scientific classification
- Kingdom: Animalia
- Phylum: Arthropoda
- Clade: Pancrustacea
- Class: Insecta
- Order: Diptera
- Family: Culicidae
- Genus: Culex
- Subgenus: Culex
- Species: C. pipiens

Binomial name
- Culex pipiens Linnaeus, 1758

Audio

= Culex pipiens =

Species of mosquito

Culex pipiens is a species of mosquito commonly referred to as the common house mosquito or northern house mosquito. Native to Africa, Asia and Europe, it is now widely distributed in temperate regions on every continent except Antarctica and is one of the most common mosquitoes found in human habitats in temperate parts of the northern hemisphere. A major vector of some viruses, it can be abundant in cities, especially those with poor wastewater management. It is the most common mosquito to the northern regions of the US. Culex pipiens is the type species for the genus Culex.

Culex pipiens includes two morphologically indistinguishable forms, Culex pipiens form pipiens and Culex pipiens form molestus. Despite their morphological similarity, the two forms exhibit striking ecological and behavioral differences. Form pipiens lives above ground and primarily feeds on birds. Form molestus, also known as the London Underground mosquito, can live under ground and frequently bites mammals including humans. The two forms are largely genetically isolated in Europe, but have been reported to hybridize in the United States. Importantly, hybrids appear to have intermediate feeding behavior, biting both humans and birds, and are implicated as a bridge vector in the maintenance and transmission of the West Nile virus from birds to humans.

In Californian molestus populations, it was shown that most females of C. pipiens do not enter reproductive diapause during the winter (homodynamy), which differs from other mosquito species, such as C. stigmatosoma or C. tarsalis. Most of them overwinter in a stage of host-seeking arrest. The practice of overwintering tends to vary based on location, and in effect temperature and the period of time per day an organism receives sunlight, also known as the photoperiod. Parous females may overwinter together with nulliparous. Overwintering mosquitoes are considered as hibernating by mosquito scientists.

Typically, mosquitoes copulate when temperatures are the most temperate, and many species begin breeding when temperatures reach 50 °F (10 °C). Because of this temperature condition, mosquito breeding seasons vary by region and climate characteristics of a given area.

== Description ==
In general, C. pipiens are a pale-to-light-brown or grey-brown color, and are adorned with lighter colored stripes or bands on the abdomen. They are between three and seven millimeters long. The insect has a proboscis, an elongated mouthpart that is used for sucking up fluids. The proboscis and wings are brown, matching the remainder of their body.

Anatomy of the common mosquito.

== Distribution ==
Culex pipiens can be found in both urban and sub-urban temperate and tropical regions across the world. It is prevalent on most continents, including North and South America, Europe, and some areas of Asia and Northern Africa.

== Habitat ==
The Culex genus, and a large number of other mosquito species, thrive in mostly wet, humid, and temperate climates. In California populations, it was shown that most females of C. pipiens do not enter reproductive diapause during the winter, which differs from other mosquito species, such as C. stigmatosoma or C. tarsalis. Most of them overwinter in a stage of host-seeking arrest. During the winter season, they survive by living in areas where they are sheltered from the elements, such as basements or sheds. Some members of this species also spend the winter season living in caves. The practice of overwintering tends to vary based on location, temperature and the period of time per day an organism receives sunlight, also known as the photoperiod.

=== Larval habitats ===
The habitats of C. pipiens larval habitats can be divided into two categories: natural, and artificial. Natural habitats include marshes, pools, manure piles, streams, and shallow ponds. Some artificial larval habitats are barrels, sewage ditches, and intermittent puddles. Many physical and chemical components of the materials that make up these habitats are critical to larval survival. Stable pH values, salt content in water, and the temperature of the habitat's environment, are all factors that can either positively or negatively influence larval survival rates. The presence of organic materials typically results in positive survival outcomes for C. pipiens. Ideal environments for C. pipiens contain significant amounts of organic matter.

=== Ecology ===
Culex pipiens is a pollinator of Silene otites, tansy (Tanacetum vulgare), and Achillea millefolium. It can see in the ultraviolet range and uses UV cues on flowers to locate them.

Lab studies have measured values related to the survival rates of C. pipiens in relation to pH levels, levels of organic material present in their habitats, temperature, and salinity levels. These studies showed that C. pipiens are capable of surviving all of these metrics in extreme values, demonstrating their eurytopic nature. Eurytopicity describes an organism's ability to tolerate a large range of habitat or ecological conditions. The development from larva to imago occurs within 20–25 days.The optimal air temperature for reproduction is 26-29 °C, relative humidity is ≈ 80%, water temperature is not less than 16-17 °C.

== Life history ==
All mosquito larvae live in the water; they are often referred to as "wigglers", since they can be characterized by a wiggling type movement in the water. The development period of larvae can range anywhere between seven and ten days, which is when they reach the pupal stage. In the pupal stage, the organisms spend less time feeding, and invest more time toward the surface of the water, taking in air from the exposed surface. After about one to three days in the pupal stage, the mosquito adult breaks through.

The growth rates of larvae are dependent on factors including temperature, food and water provisions, larval density and characteristics of the breeding season they are born into.

== Complex ==
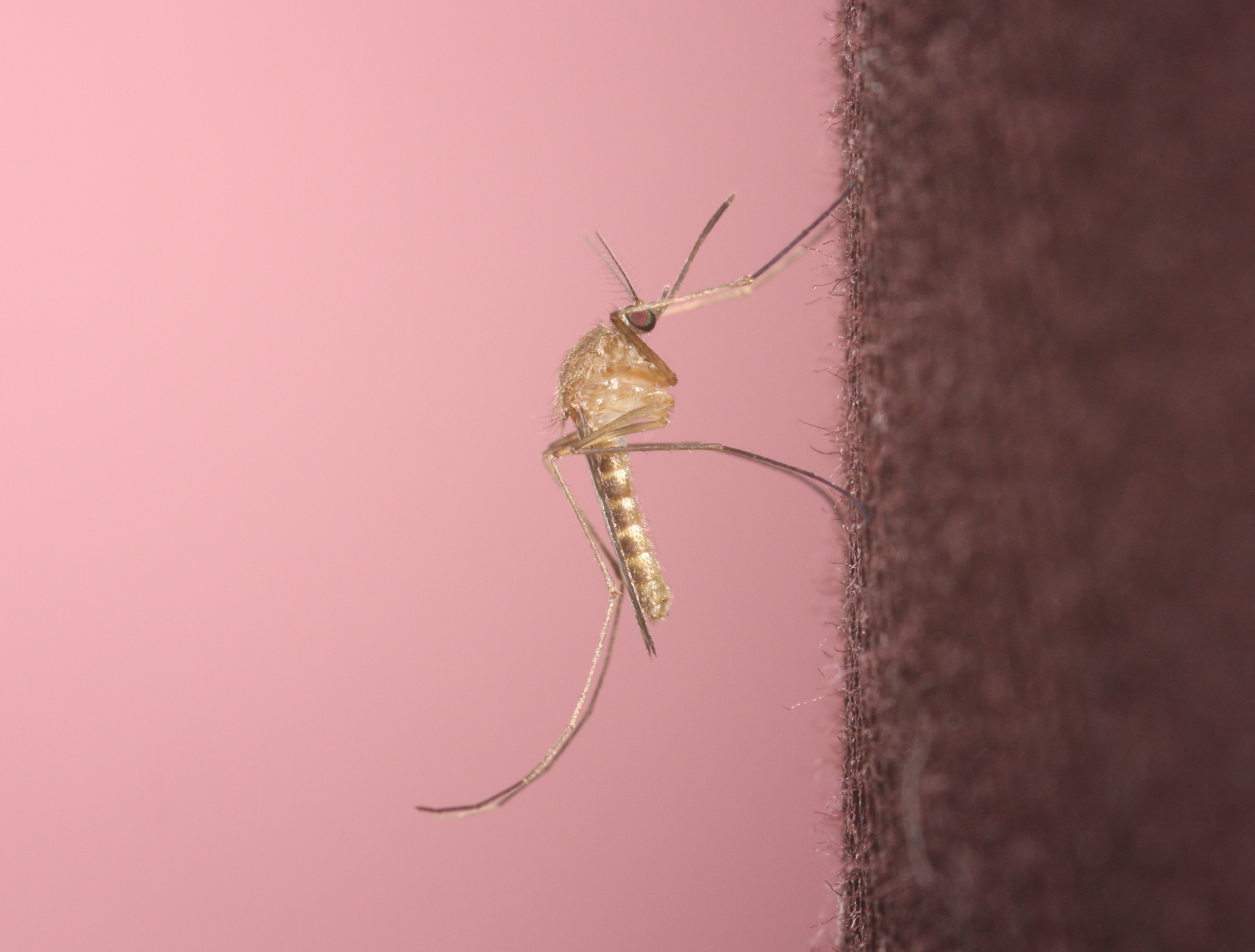
Magnified image of the C. pipiens body.

The C. pipiens species complex consists of:

- C. pipiens
  - C. p. pallens – human-biting (Northeast Asia)
  - C. p. pipiens (Global, temperate)
    - C. p. p. f. pipiens – "bird-biting"
    - C. p. p. f. molestus – London Underground mosquito
- C. quinquefasciatus (Global, tropical)
- C. australicus (Australia)
- C. globocoxitus (Australia)
- C. juppi – proposed (South Africa)

The C. pipiens complex is characterized by its ability to thrive in mainly water-based habitats that contain high amounts of organic material. Furthermore, measured rates of success of the complex has been associated with consumption of "food" found in standing water sources that have been developed by humans and livestock. Some interspecific hybrids are widespread.

As vector borne pathogen transmission is highly influenced by the ecology of the vector, it is evident that C. pipiens' ability to adapt to human-altered environments led to its global distribution as a vector. With these environmental adaptations, the species' interactions with humans and other organisms (especially birds), has also led to an increase in the number of avian pathogens that humans around the world are exposed to.

== Physiology ==
In C. pipiens, there is a strong correlation between the digestion of blood and ovary development. The cycle of blood digestion leading to ovarian developments is known as the gonotrophic cycle. It occurs in three stages: finding a blood source, digesting blood, and laying eggs. Laying eggs is also referred to as oviposition. The number of cycles a female C. pipiens goes through depends on a variety of environmental factors. Each one of the gonotrophic cycles results in morphological changes in the female's reproductive organs, stomach, and throat. Temperature is one environmental factor in particular that affects the rate of blood consumption and its correlation to ovary development.

== Diet ==
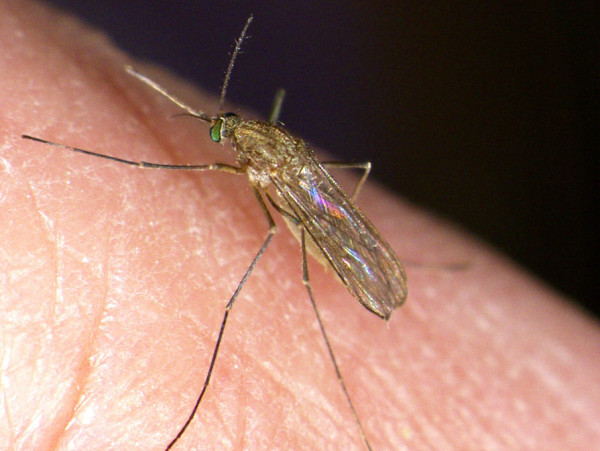
Culex pipiens pipiens feeding on a human host.

Culex pipiens prefer the blood of bird species that are closely linked to human interaction such as doves and pigeons; however, they do consume human blood. At the end of the summer and the start of the fall season before it is time for them to overwinter, C. pipiens subsist on nectar and other sugary food sources in order to store fat. Therefore, C. pipiens consume both vertebrate blood (including human blood) as well as sugar-heavy energy sources like nectar. Only females feed on blood, while males limit themselves to sugary food sources. The time of day is also a factor that influences C. pipiens' eating behaviors. These mosquitoes feed most frequently during the early hours of sunset. Feeding on carbohydrate sources, rather than blood, helps with fat storage. This is why this specific feeding behavior is seen before the winter season.

=== Food sources ===
Culex pipiens feed on a variety of different food sources. Sugar is one important source of food that provides C. pipiens with similar amounts of energy as blood does. Both males and females obtain sugar through feeding on plant sugar, floral nectar, and honeydew, which are found via olfactory and visual cues. Female C. pipiens differ from males in the way that they consume both blood and sugar as sources of food, whereas males only rely on these sugar sources for energy. They obtain blood hosts such as birds, humans, cattle, etc. for feeding. Searching for sources of blood requires a complex of behavioral responses that influence C. pipiens sensory mechanisms that help them to locate hosts.^{[1]} Females contain 1,300 sensory organs, while males have 1,350. Garvin et al. 2018 find C. pipiens to be more attracted to adult birds than nestlings, by differentiating between uropygial gland secretions of different ages (tested in Passer domesticus).

=== Food procurement ===
There are many stages that make up C. pipiens feeding activity. These stages are known as activation, orientation, landing, and probing. Locating a host requires both visual and chemical cues from the environment to allow C. pipiens to sense where the host is.

== Mating ==
Typically, mosquitoes copulate when temperatures are the most temperate, and many species begin breeding when temperatures reach 50 °F (10 °C). Because of this temperature condition, mosquito breeding seasons vary by region and climate characteristics of a given area. Sexual activity in C. pipiens first begins within the first 2–3 days of emergence from the larval development stage. Antennal fibrillae play an important role in C. pipiens mating practices. The erection of these fibrillae is considered to be the first stage in reproduction. These fibrillae serve different functions across the sexes. As antennal fibrillae are used by female C. pipiens to locate hosts to feed on, male C. pipiens utilize them to locate female mates.

=== Fertilization ===
Temperature has a direct impact on the outcome of fertilization. Studies have demonstrated that female insemination relies on higher temperatures to produce successful outcomes, as colder temperatures increase the number of underdeveloped C. pipiens eggs. Another factor that affects fertilization outcomes is the age of females. In 1972, Lea and Evans performed a study that yielded results showing that the number of inseminated females drastically increased with age. Specifically, only females older than 18–24 hours can be successfully inseminated by a male mate. Furthermore, C. pipiens is believed to be a monogamous species, mating only once (and with one partner) throughout the duration of its life.

=== Female rejection kicks ===
Courting C. pipiens males have the chance to be directly accepted by a mating female. However, there is evidence for a mating behavior performed by female C. pipiens in which females utilize rejection kicks to deter courting males away. Despite this behavior, there is evidence that courting males can still be accepted by females after these rejection kicks. According to a study done to observe this mating behavior, pursuing males are accepted by the female upon first genital contact at a rate of 38.95%, and are accepted at a rate of 17.89% after some rejection kicks from the female, demonstrating that there is a chance of successful mating between male and female C. pipiens even if this rejection mechanism is performed by the female. Furthermore, the recorded success of females performing this behavior with their right limbs is higher than those who used their left. This courting behavior illustrates a behavioral mechanism for females to dismiss certain males from mating with them, and demonstrate an overall functional advantage that is associated with the use of right hind limbs over left ones.

=== Breeding site characteristics ===
Culex pipiens reproduce in bodies of water—specifically in flood-prone areas and in standing water. Other breeding sites include: natural marshes, cesspits, gutters, and other unkempt artificial water structures. Furthermore, the presence of organic material in breeding grounds is essential for the larval developmental stage. All mosquito species produce larvae that live in the water. According to Daniel Markowski from the Vector Disease Control International, "Culex pipiens larvae specifically thrive in such stagnant water with the most organic material pollution".

The number of larvae present in one breeding site also impacts the success rates of offspring survival. A 1973 study done by Skierska analyzed the effects that larval density had on survival rates. The study showed that the highest larval survival occurred when the larvae density ranged between 20 and 50 organisms. Within this population range, development periods of the larvae were also the fastest compared to larvae densities that existed above this range. Increased larval densities also affected how many eggs were produced among females that survived within the original experimental population. When densities were higher, fewer eggs were produced by these surviving females.

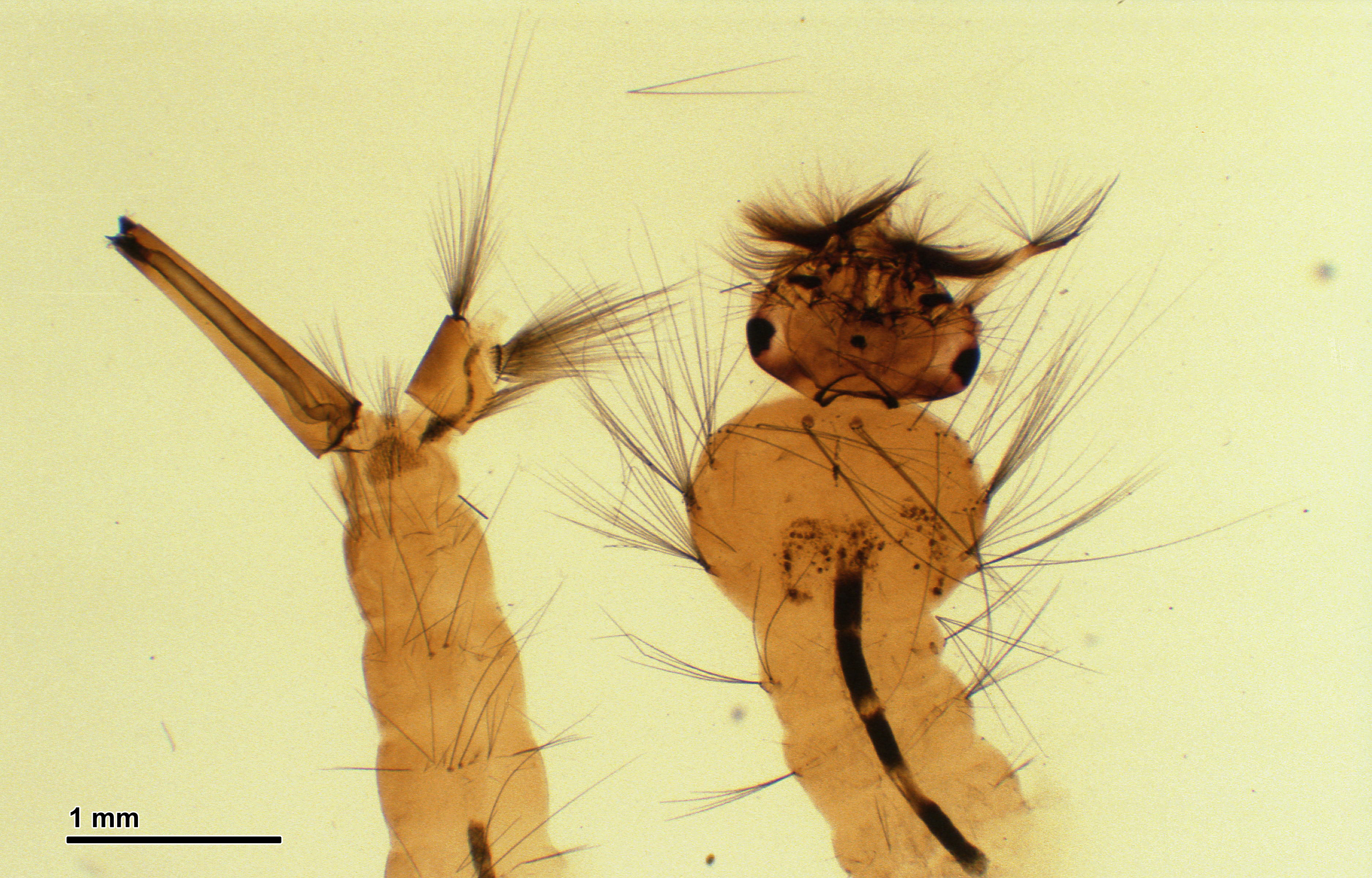
Magnified image of the tail end and the head of C. pipiens during the larval stage of development.

==== Swarming patterns ====
Swarming is not essential to mating for C. pipiens, as lab experiments have demonstrated that successful mating can occur in laboratory settings, where swarming patterns are unattainable. C. pipiens mating can occur as a female is resting. However, there has been evidence found linked to how swarming patterns do operate, when present in certain populations. The position of the sun has an effect on swarming patterns. Light patterns associated with both sunset and sunrise can cause swarming to develop. Swarms develop usually to a distinct marker, which C. pipiens use as a common metric to denote where swarming should occur. Within these swarm formations, C. pipiens have been observed to move around in elliptical loop patterns.

=== Autogeny ===
Autogeny is the ability to lay eggs without prior consumption of blood. This trait varies across the C. pipiens complex, and could limit transmission of pathogens since females do not risk food contamination in order to lay eggs.

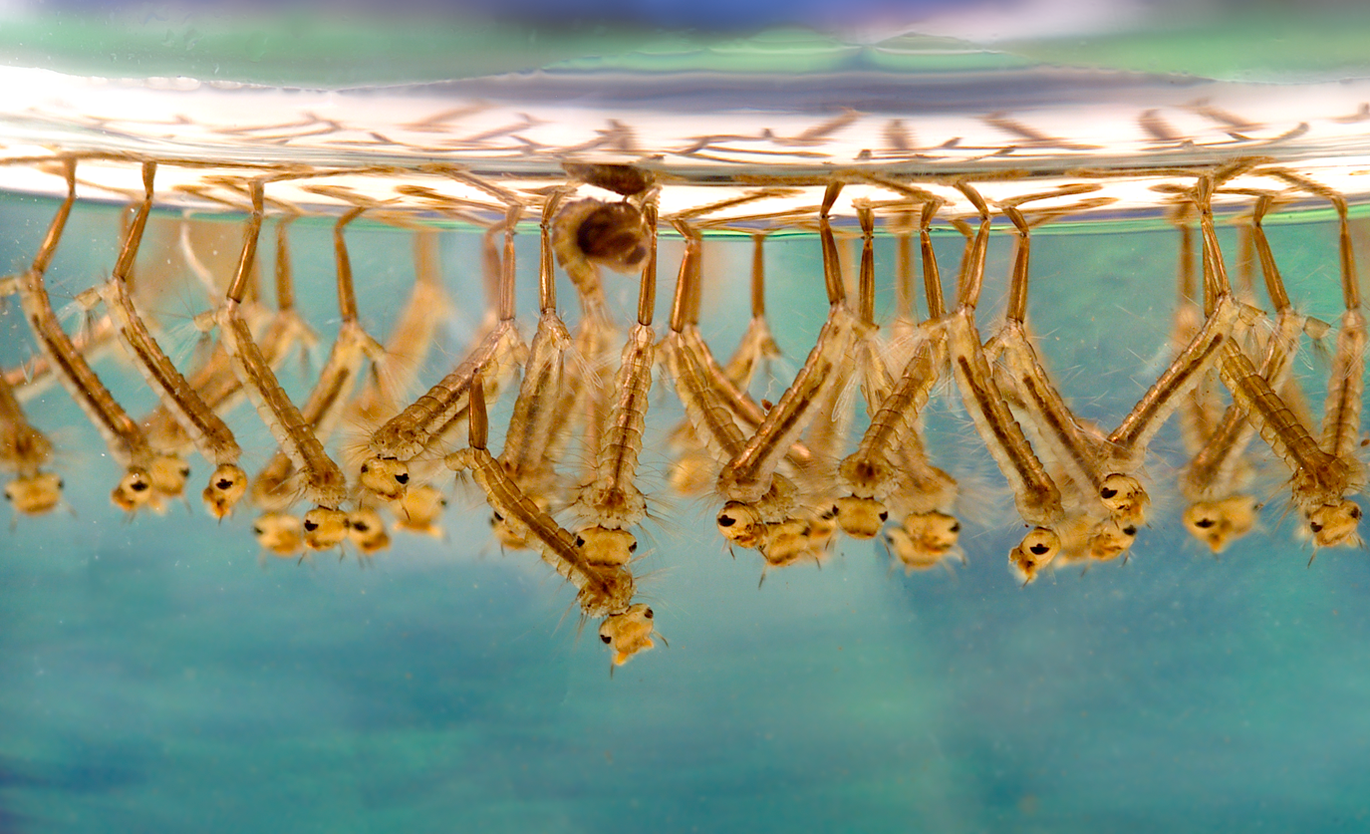
An image of C. pipiens larvae occupying a water-submerged environment. They come closer to the water's surface as the larval development period comes closer to an end. By (Image: James Gathany, CDC) – A New Model for Predicting Outbreaks of West Nile Virus. Gross L, PLoS Biology Vol. 4/4/2006, e101. https://dx.doi.org/10.1371/journal.pbio.0040101. See also: Kilpatrick AM, Kramer LD, Jones MJ, Marra PP, Daszak P (2006) West Nile Virus Epidemics in North America Are Driven by Shifts in Mosquito Feeding Behavior. PLoS Biol 4(4): e82 doi:10.1371/journal.pbio.0040082, CC BY 2.5, https://commons.wikimedia.org/w/index.php?curid=1441809

== Disease vectors ==
Mosquito-borne diseases are widespread throughout the globe. According to the World Health Organization, these diseases affected nearly 350 million people worldwide in 2017. Culex pipiens is one of the many members of the mosquito family that is a carrier of disease. Specifically, C. pipiens are well known carriers of West Nile virus, Saint Louis encephalitis viruses, avian malaria (Plasmodium relictum), and filarial worms.

Culex pipiens is not a vector of P. homocircumflexum, a parasite of unknown vector which is only known to be unable to get beyond the oocyst stage in this and several other mosquitoes.

=== Mosquito bites ===
Mosquito bites can affect warm, uncovered areas of the body, and reactions to the bites vary in severity. Once a host is bitten by a mosquito, the mosquito uses its proboscis to take in blood. In the process of digesting blood, mosquitoes inject saliva instantly after the proboscis enters the host. Many humans display an allergic reaction to the saliva.

=== Arbovirus diseases ===
Arboviruses are diseases that are transmitted to vertebrates by arthropods, including insects. Culex pipiens carries many arbovirus diseases across many regions of the globe. Cases of Rift Valley fever have been present in Africa, Japanese encephalitis has been prevalent in East Asian countries, and West Nile virus has been seen all over the globe.

== Global impact ==
In February 2019, a theoretical modelling study was reported regarding the potential role of C. pipiens in transmitting West Nile Virus in the UK. Empirical data were taken from a study conducted during 2015 in Southern England in order to obtain a better understanding of the seasonal abundance patterns, thereby helping to identify the season(s) when the species thrives best and is the most populous.

== See also ==
- List of Culex species
- Oviparity
- Vector
