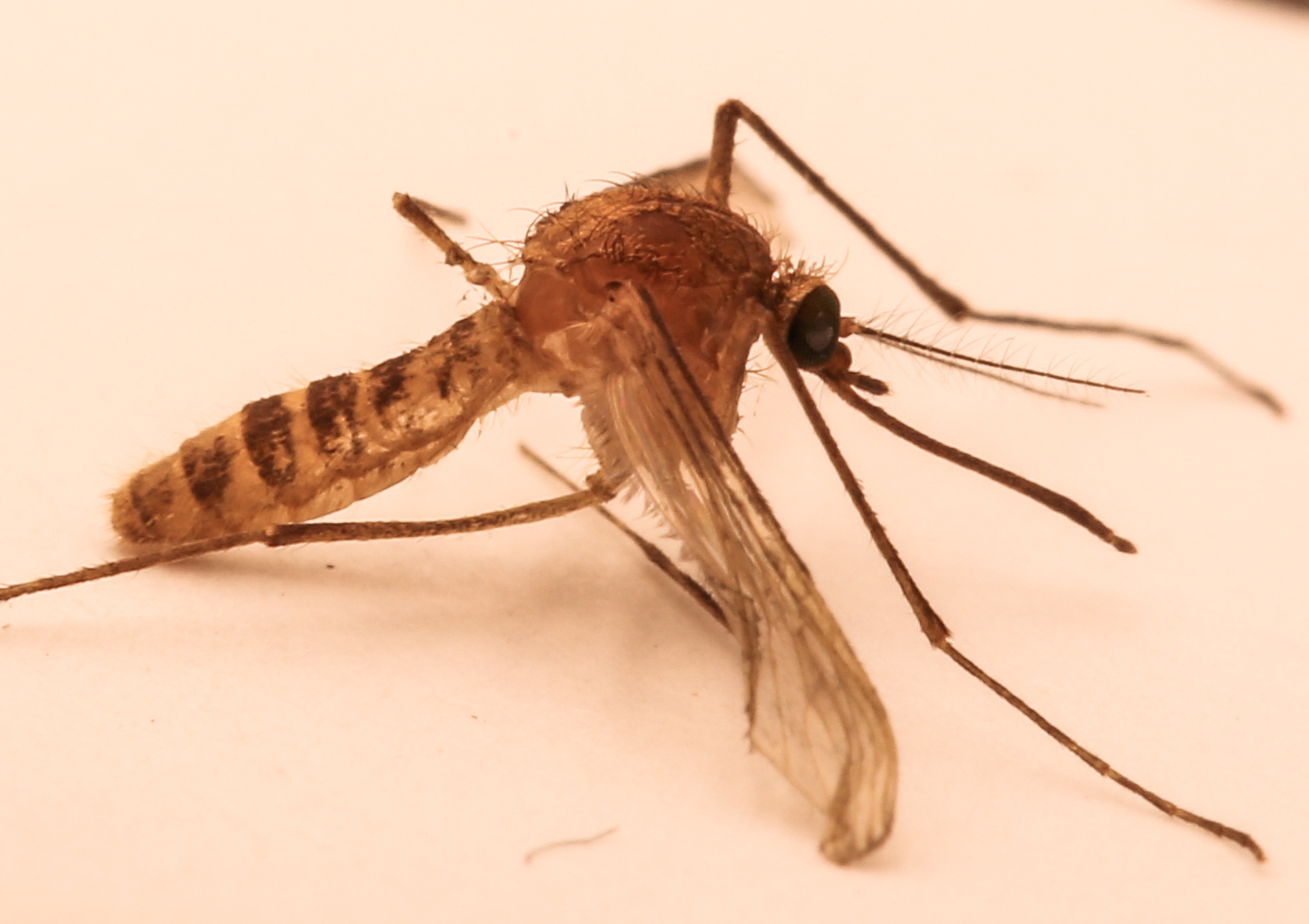

Scientific classification
- Kingdom: Animalia
- Phylum: Arthropoda
- Clade: Pancrustacea
- Class: Insecta
- Order: Diptera
- Family: Culicidae
- Genus: Culex
- Species: C. pipiens
- Form: C. p. f. molestus

Trionomial name
- Culex pipiens f. molestus

= London Underground mosquito =

Culex pipiens f. molestus

Species of mosquito

The London Underground mosquito, Culex pipiens f. molestus, is a form of mosquito. It is named for its biting of people sleeping in the London Underground railway system during the Blitz, but it has a worldwide distribution and long predates the existence of the London Underground. It was first described in the 18th century based on Egyptian specimens by the biologist Peter Forsskål (1732–1763). He named it Culex molestus due to its voracious biting, but later biologists reclassified it as Culex pipiens f. molestus because there were no morphological differences between it and Culex pipiens.

A study from 2004 analyzing DNA microsatellites suggested that it might be a distinct species, but a paper from 2012 reported it to be "a physiological and ecological variant of Cx. pipiens" which should not be considered a distinct species. As of 2024, the consensus among researchers is that it is not a distinct species, but a form of Culex pipiens, which is often referred to as Culex pipiens f. molestus.

While genetic studies showed that it most likely evolved in various human settlements in southern Europe or the Middle East a few thousand years ago, its vernacular name and studies of genetic differentiation in London introduced a popular misconception that molestus originated in the London Underground less than 100 years ago, representing one of the most rapid events of adaptation and speciation. However, recent meta-analysis and large-scale genomic study have confirmed that molestus evolved above ground in the Middle East ~2000 years ago, likely adapting to ancient human agricultural societies. Molestus then colonized below ground habitats like subways and basements in northern Europe (and subsequently across the globe) as humans have developed modern cities more recently. The adaptive traits that evolved in the ancient times have become useful for them to colonize more recent urban environments, providing a striking example of exaptation.

== Description ==
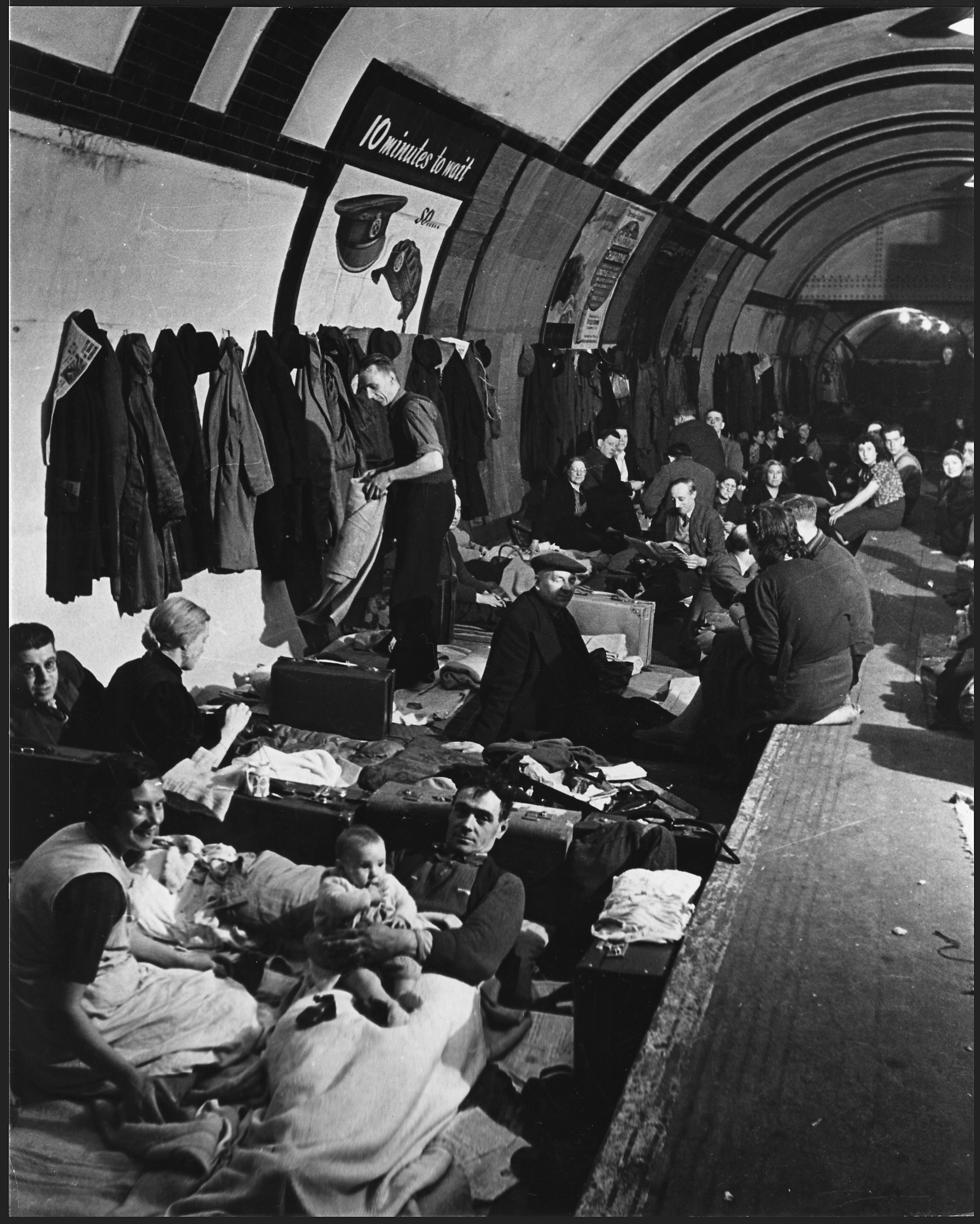
Londoners sheltering from the Blitz in underground stations suffered from mosquito bites

This mosquito is found in underground systems around the world. Some authors have proposed that it is a new species that evolved since the 19th century in adaptation to human-made underground systems, but it is more likely that it has been in existence for at least hundreds of years and colonized the warm underground spaces of northern cities.

Behavioral evidence that it is a distinct form of C. pipiens comes from research by Kate Byrne and Richard Nichols. The forms have very different behaviours, are extremely difficult to mate, and with different allele frequencies consistent with genetic drift during a founder event. Specifically, C. pipiens f. molestus, breeds all-year round, is cold intolerant, and bites rats, mice, and humans, in contrast to the above-ground form, which is cold tolerant, hibernates in the winter, and is considered to mostly feed on bird hosts. When the two forms were crossbred by Byrne and Nichols, the eggs were infertile, suggesting reproductive isolation. Genomic data also support that they seem genetically distinct even where they co-exist side-by-side aboveground in the southern part of the distribution.

== Hosts ==
Unlike the bird-biting form pipiens, molestus is primarily a mammal-biter. In a controlled experiment in the lab, molestus prefers to bite humans over birds. Hybrids between pipiens and molestus have an intermediate preference where they both bite humans and birds, becoming an important 'bridge vector' that can spill devastating virus such as West Nile virus from bird populations into humans. Genomic analyses suggest more intense urbanization leads to higher rate of hybridization between pipiens and molestus, likely due to increased contact between the two distinct forms, thus exposing increased risk of West Nile virus spillover for humans in more densely populated urban cities.

== Parasites ==
For decades Cx. pipiens f. molestus was known as a fully competent host of only one kind of malaria, Plasmodium garnhami. Only this Plasmodium had been demonstrated to complete sporogony by Garnham 1966. Due to this lack of study a team investigated whether a more common kind of malaria could also go through the life cycle. Žiegytė et al. 2014 find that P. relictum also completes sporogony in Cx. pipiens f. molestus. They also discovered that two P. relictum strains differing only by one base pair produced markedly different parasitemia of the insect; pGRW11 much more than pSGS1.

== Heredity ==
Genetic data indicate that different groups of C. pipiens f. molestus in the London Underground have a common ancestry, rather than the population at each station being related to the nearest above-ground population. Byrne and Nichols concluded that it was plausible that there was a single colonization of the London Underground.

Genetic evidence reported by Fonseca and others suggests a single C. pipiens f. molestus form has spread throughout Europe and beyond, since populations over a large area share a common genetic heritage. These widely separated populations are distinguished by minor genetic differences; a single mtDNA difference is shared among the underground populations of 10 Russian cities, and a single fixed microsatellite difference occurs in populations spanning Europe, Japan, Australia, the Middle East, and the Atlantic islands. This worldwide spread might have occurred after the last glaciations or may be even more recent.

Also, the Fonseca paper argued that the colonization of America by Culex mosquitoes involved a strain derived from a hybrid of "genetically distinct entities:" C. pipiens and another which, "for the sake of brevity", they called "C. molestus". They suggested that hybridization might explain why the American form bites both birds and humans (this interpretation is controversial, see letter from Spielman et al. and the response that follows it in Science). The consequences of its indiscriminate feeding hit the news in 1999 with the outbreak of human encephalitis in New York, caused by West Nile virus. It was the first documented introduction of this virus into the Western Hemisphere; perhaps because in the longer established populations, the Old World northern above-ground C. pipiens almost exclusively bites birds, with the human-biting ones being incarcerated below ground.

== Distribution ==
Culex pipiens f. molestus has been observed in North and South America, Europe, Asia, Africa, and Australasia. It was first described in Egypt in the late 1700s, and has likely spread via trade and colonial passages over the past centuries.

In the summer of 2011, an invasion of Culex pipiens f. molestus appeared on the Upper West Side in Manhattan, New York City. The mosquito is well known for being commonly found in sewers of New York and thriving throughout the year feeding on humans. Residents of older brownstones found the mosquitoes coming into basements and then through air vents and other openings into their homes. The city government did not make this infestation of the pest a top priority because they tested negative for West Nile virus and because of the high cost of mosquito control.

In Australia, Culex pipiens f. molestus was first recorded in the 1940s, and has since spread across all southern states, causing a significant biting nuisance in urban areas. Unlike most Australian urban mosquitos, it is active through all 12 months of the year. Its introduction was likely through military movements into Melbourne during World War II, and genetic studies have indicated its most likely passage was from eastern Asia and Japan. It has also been identified as a potential vector for several Australian blood-borne diseases, such as Ross River virus.
