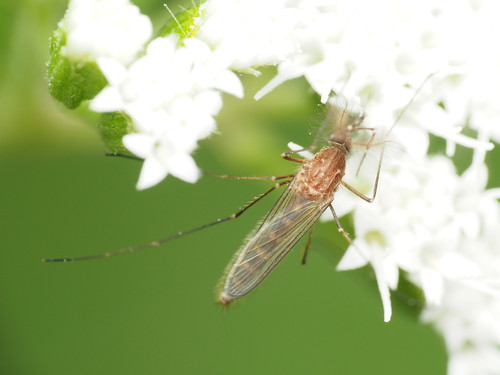
- An adult male Cx. restuans resting on a flowering plant

Scientific classification
- Kingdom: Animalia
- Phylum: Arthropoda
- Clade: Pancrustacea
- Class: Insecta
- Order: Diptera
- Family: Culicidae
- Genus: Culex
- Subgenus: Culex
- Species: C. restuans

Binomial name
- Culex restuans Theobald, 1901

= Culex restuans =

Species of mosquito

Culex restuans is a species of mosquito known to occur in Canada, the United States, Mexico, Guatemala, Honduras, and the Bahamas. It is a disease vector for St. Louis encephalitis and West Nile virus. In 2013 West Nile Virus positive specimens were collected in Southern California.

== Taxonomy ==
Culex restuans is a mosquito, falling within the family Culicidae. It is a member of the tribe Culicini and the genus Culex. It is considered part of the Pipiens group and the Restuans species complex.

== Description ==
=== Adults ===
Culex restuans is a medium-sized brown mosquito, with adult female wing length ranging from 4 to 4.4mm. It is occasionally called the "white-dotted mosquito", referring to two white dots sometimes found on the dorsal scutum. This, however, is not a reliable character for identification because scales that constitute these spots can fall off and some adult mosquitoes eclose without these spots. Without these distinctive white dots, this species looks very similar to another medically important Culex mosquito, Cx pipiens.

A paper published in 2020 addresses the lack of reliable distinguishing characters between Cx. pipiens and restuans in reputable keys, and identified five characters that reliably distinguished these two species in their data set collected from Minnesota and Wisconsin. The coloration and number of erect scales on the dorsal area of the head, number of setae on the upper thoracic proepisternum, coloration of prepostnotal setae, coloration of setae found on the mid-lobe of the scutellum, and coloration of wing remigial setae were all found to be reliable characters for distinguishing these two species in their data set. More research needs to be done on Cx. pipiens and restuans populations throughout the United States before these characters can confidently be incorporated into a larger taxonomic key.

=== Larvae ===
Diagram of Culex restuans larval morphology.

Like other mosquito larvae, Cx restuans larvae are aquatic and swim by wiggling, which is why they are commonly referred to as "wigglers." They are worm-like in appearance, with distinct brush-like mouthparts, a round thorax, abdominal segments with distinct lateral tufts of setae, and a siphon at the end of their abdomen which they use to breathe. Cx restuans larvae can be recognized from other species of Culex from at least three long, individual setae on their siphon that are irregularly placed; siphon setae of other Culex species are found in groups or tufts.

== Natural history ==
=== Life cycle, habitat, and oviposition behavior ===
Like other dipterans, Cx. restuans is a holometabolous insect with egg, larval, pupal, and adult life stages. Gravid, blood-fed females lay egg rafts which float in standing water. The quality of water does not matter much; larvae have been found in water that ranges from clean to polluted. They go through four larval instars before pupating and then eclosing into adults; this process can take a minimum of 10 days in water with plenty of organic matter.

Immature Cx. restuans are commonly found in small containers, with one notable example being discarded vehicle tires. These are significant in regards to vector dynamics because of their usual proximity to human habitat and their ability to assist in expansion of mosquito range.

Females have been found to decrease oviposition in containers with preexisting larvae of the same species and are more likely to lay eggs in nutrient-rich water sources, suggesting that females make oviposition-related decisions based on the future competition of their offspring.

=== Diet ===
Female Cx. restuans adults opportunistically feed mainly on birds, but will occasionally feed on mammals; this allows them to act as an enzootic vector in the West Nile virus transmission cycle. Whether or not these mosquitoes bite humans is a controversial topic -- some say they bite humans often, but some say they are bird-feeders and rarely bite humans.

The diet of Cx. restuans larvae remains largely unknown, but in the laboratory they are commonly fed on a diet that consists of ingredients like fish food, rabbit pellets, and liver powder.

== Control Methods ==
For the control of medically important mosquito species like Cx. restuans in the United States, synthetic pyrethroids and organophosphates are the most commonly used adulticides; insect growth regulators like methoprene and bacteria such as Bacillus thuringiensis israelensis (Bti) and Lysinibacillus sphaericus are commonly used larvicides.

Insecticide resistance in Cx. restuans populations is a prevalent problem facing vector control programs. The Northeast Regional Center for Vector-Borne Disease reports widespread trends of low- and moderate-level insecticide resistance to methoprene in Culex spp. populations in the northeast United States. Instances of moderate and high level resistance to pyrethroids have increased in recent years.

Entomophthoraceae family, fungus Species Erynia conica infects (and kills) mosquitos Aedes aegypti and Culex restuans. Attempts are being made to use it as a biological control for the insect.
