= Dyann Wirth =

American immunologist (born 1951)

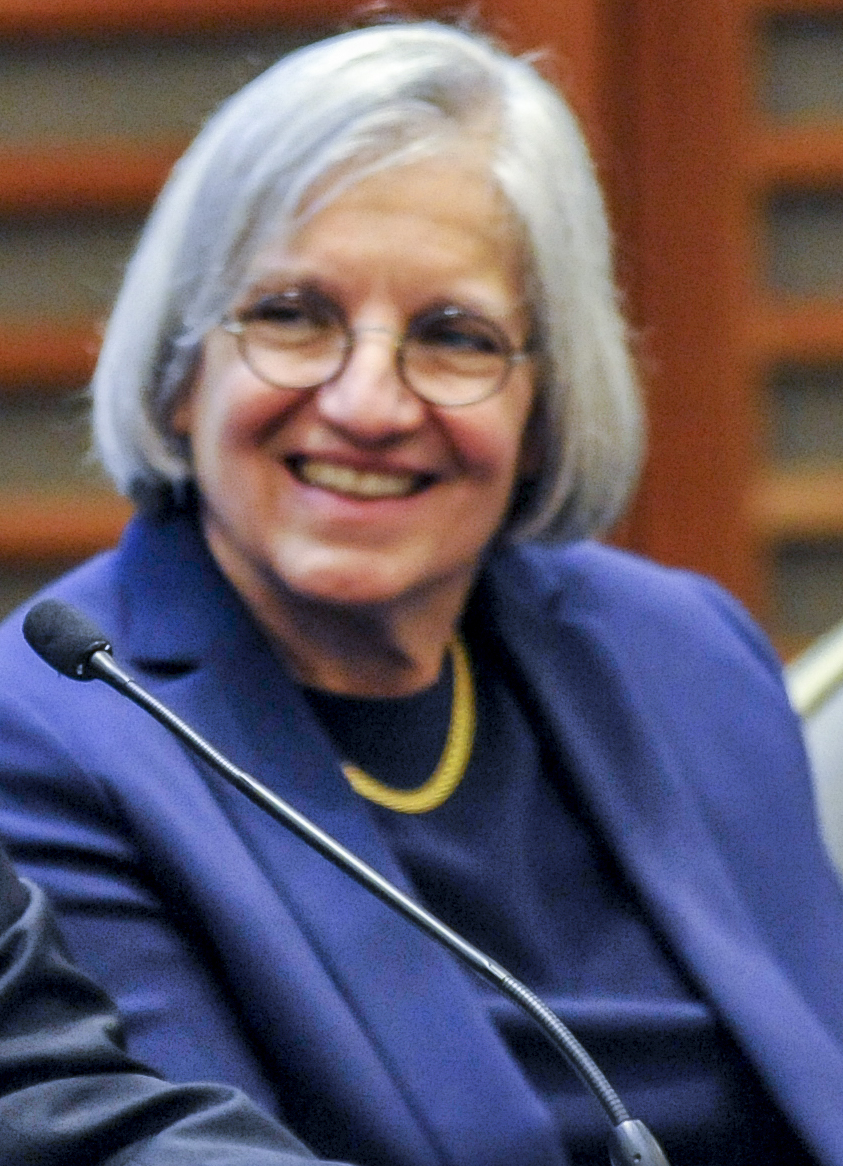
- Wirth on a President's Malaria Initiative panel in 2016
- Born: Dyann Lynn Fergus; January 31, 1951 (age 75); Racine, Wisconsin
- Citizenship: American
- Education: University of Wisconsin-Madison; Massachusetts Institute of Technology
- Known for: Leading malariologist
- Scientific career
- Workplaces: Harvard T.H. Chan School of Public Health

Dyann F. Wirth (born Dyann Lynn Fergus, January 31, 1951, Racine, Wisconsin) is an American immunologist. She is currently the Richard Pearson Strong Professor of Infectious Diseases at Harvard T.H. Chan School of Public Health.

Wirth is one of the world's leading malariologists, dealing with how the genus Plasmodium has evolved in terms of population biology, drug resistance, and antigenicity. The Wirth laboratory combines the expertise of the Harvard School of Public Health, the Broad Institute, and international collaborators for malaria research and training in public health.

== Education and career ==
Wirth received her B.A. from the University of Wisconsin-Madison and her Ph.D. from the Massachusetts Institute of Technology in 1978.

== Research ==
Wirth's lab identified the cytochrome B gene of the avian malaria species Plasmodium gallinaceum in 1989, as genetic study of the parasite was in its early days. In 1993 the labs of Wirth and Kamini Nirmala Mendis published the first successful use of the electroporation method to insert new DNA sequence into a malaria cell (also Plasmodium gallinaceum).

== Awards and honors ==
Wirth was awarded the American Society of Tropical Medicine and Hygiene's Bailey K. Ashford Medal, given for distinguished work in tropical medicine, in 1995, and the Joseph Augustin LePrince Medal, for contributions to malariology, in 2015. In 2016, she was elected as a fellow of the American Society of Tropical Medicine and Hygiene. In 2021 she was awarded the American Society of Tropical Medicine and Hygiene's Walter Reed Medal.

== Selected publications ==
- Synthesis and processing of the Sindbis virus structural proteins, 1978
- Malaria : Natural Selection and New Medicine, 2010
- Malaria : biology in the era of eradication, 2016
