= Aedes bahamensis =

Scientific classification
- Kingdom: Animalia
- Phylum: Arthropoda
- Class: Insecta
- Order: Diptera
- Family: Culicidae
- Genus: Aedes
- Subgenus: Howardina
- Species: A. bahamensis

Binomial name
- Aedes bahamensis Berlin, 1969

Species of mosquito

Aedes bahamensis, also known as Howardina bahamensis, is a mosquito native to the Caribbean and Bahamas, which was first discovered in two counties of southern Florida in 1986. The females of the species do not require a blood meal to produce eggs, although they will bite if starved of nectar or in order to produce a second brood. They are thought to be capable of transmitting St. Louis encephalitis.
