= Plasmodium matutinum =

Scientific classification
- Domain: Eukaryota
- Clade: Sar
- Clade: Alveolata
- Phylum: Apicomplexa
- Class: Aconoidasida
- Order: Haemospororida
- Family: Plasmodiidae
- Genus: Plasmodium
- Species: P. matutinum

Binomial name
- Plasmodium matutinum Huff, 1937

Species of single-celled organism

Plasmodium matutinum is a parasite of the genus Plasmodium subgenus Haemamoeba.

Like all Plasmodium species P. matutinum has both vertebrate and insect hosts. The vertebrate hosts for this parasite are birds.

== Taxonomy ==
The parasite was first described by Huff in 1937.

For some time this species was thought to be a subspecies of Plasmodium relictum.

== Hosts ==
This species infects the thrush nightingale (Luscinia luscinia).
