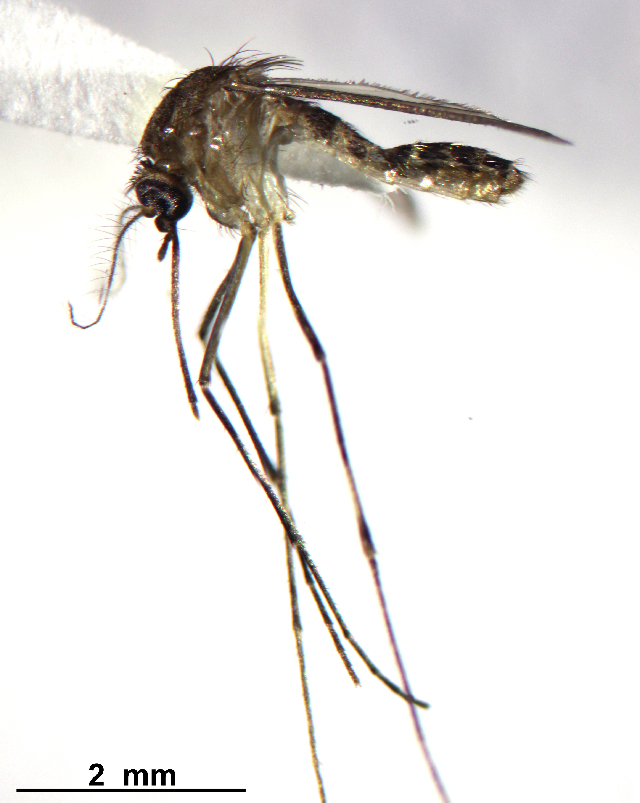

Scientific classification
- Kingdom: Animalia
- Phylum: Arthropoda
- Class: Insecta
- Order: Diptera
- Family: Culicidae
- Genus: Culex
- Species: C. nigripalpus

Binomial name
- Culex nigripalpus Theobald, 1901.

= Culex nigripalpus =

Species of mosquito

Culex nigripalpus (Florida SLE mosquito) is a species of medium-sized, dark, blood-feeding mosquito of the family Culicidae.

== Distribution ==
Culex nigripalpus has been found to occur in the following countries: Anguilla, Bahamas, Barbados, Belize, Brazil, Colombia, Costa Rica, Cuba, Dominica, Dominican Republic, Ecuador, El Salvador, French Guiana, Grenada, Guadeloupe, Guatemala, Guyana, Haiti, Honduras, Jamaica, Martinique, Mexico, Montserrat, Nicaragua, Panama, Paraguay, Peru, Puerto Rico, Saint Lucia, Saint Vincent and the Grenadines, Suriname, Trinidad and Tobago, United States, Venezuela, Virgin Islands. In the United States, it is found from Texas to North Carolina in warm, humid coastal habitats and in the Mississippi River basin as far north as Kentucky.

== Ecology ==
Culex nigripalpus larvae live in fresh water in semi-permanent or permanent marshes, ditches, retention ponds, and grassy pools, and females prefer to lay eggs in freshly flooded ditches.

== Medical significance ==
Culex nigripalpus is a principal disease vector in Florida – the primary enzootic vector to wild birds and the primary epidemic vector to humans of the Saint Louis encephalitis (SLE) virus. It has been experimentally demonstrated to be capable of transmitting West Nile virus (WNV). Its habit of feeding on both birds and humans gives it significant potential for transmission of zoonotic infections from birds to humans. It is also a vector of transmission of Eastern equine encephalitis (EEE), dog heartworm, and Avian malaria.
