= Kamini Nirmala Mendis =

Sri Lankan malaria researcher

Kamini Nirmala Mendis is a Sri Lankan professor emeritus at the University of Colombo and former malaria expert at the World Health Organization (WHO).

== Education ==
Mendis went to Visakha Vidyalaya school in Colombo. She went to the University of Ceylon to study medicine in 1972, and then moved to the University of London in the UK for her PhD in 1980. For her M.D. in Microbiology, to complete her medical training, Mendis returned to her alma mater in 1989, now split into the University of Colombo.

== Career ==
Mendis was awarded a National Presidents Award for Outstanding Citizens in 1983. In 1988, Mendis established the Malaria Research Unit within the Department of Parasitology of the University of Colombo, and she led them for 17 years. Mendis won the 1991 Chalmers Medal from the Royal Society of Tropical Medicine and Hygiene, and the 1993 Bailey K. Ashford Medal from the American Society of Tropical Medicine and Hygiene.

In 1993, the labs of Mendis and Dyann Wirth published the first successful use of the electroporation method to insert new DNA sequence into a malaria cell, in this case Plasmodium gallinaceum.

Mendis is considered to have been an "architect" of Sri Lanka's successful elimination of malaria, and often writes about how the country needs to actively maintain this status. She continues to be a member of the WHO Malaria Policy Advisory Committee.
