= Plasmodium tejerai =

Scientific classification
- Domain: Eukaryota
- Clade: Sar
- Clade: Alveolata
- Phylum: Apicomplexa
- Class: Aconoidasida
- Order: Haemospororida
- Family: Plasmodiidae
- Genus: Plasmodium
- Species: P. tejerai

Binomial name
- Plasmodium tejerai Gabaldon and Ulloa, 1977

Species of single-celled organism

Plasmodium tejerai is a parasite of the genus Plasmodium subgenus Haemamoeba.

Like all Plasmodium species P. tejerai has both vertebrate and insect hosts. The vertebrate hosts for this parasite are birds.

== Taxonomy ==
The parasite was first described by Gabaldon and Ulloa in 1977.

== Distribution ==
This parasite is found in Brazil and Venezuela.

== Vectors ==
Not known.

== Clinical features and host pathology ==
This organism infects the domestic turkey (Meleagris gallopavo) and the South American penguin (Spheniscus magellanicus).

Morphologically this parasite resembles Plasmodium relictum closely. In the penguin infection may be fatal with splenomegaly, hepatomegaly, hydropericardium and pulmonary oedema.
