= Culex globocoxitus =

Scientific classification
- Kingdom: Animalia
- Phylum: Arthropoda
- Clade: Pancrustacea
- Class: Insecta
- Order: Diptera
- Family: Culicidae
- Genus: Culex
- Species: C. globocoxitus

Binomial name
- Culex globocoxitus Dobrotworsky, 1953

Species of mosquito

Culex globocoxitus is a species of mosquito in the genus Culex that is endemic to Australia. It is a member of the subgenus Culex and the C. pipiens species complex. It is known to breed in open swamps and brackish water, and has been collected in coastal south-west Western Australia. The species is active throughout the entire year, but peaks between July and November. Females generally do not bite humans, the host is most likely birds.

This mosquito may crossbreed with other members of the pipens complex, and a globocoxitus × molestus hybrid has been bred in a lab setting.

== Distribution ==
Endemic to Australia, Culex globocoxitus occurs in south-western Queensland, New South Wales, southern Northern Territory, South Australia, Tasmania, Victoria, and south-western Western Australia.

== Description ==
Culex globocoxitus is a medium-sized mosquito. Proboscis is dark above with a paler tip, and about 2.34 mm in length. Scutum is a light brown, clothed with dense light brown and cream scales. Abdominal tergites are black with broad basal bands. Sternites are white to cream. The legs are mainly dark but the hindfemora are pale ventrally. Wings are dark as well, 3.0–3.5 mm in length.

Reproductive activity is maintained throughout the year, one to two generations are completed during winter. Mating occurs in spaces as small as 3 cubic inches, in flight or while resting, at temperatures above 13 °C.

== Eggs & larvae ==
Larvae and eggs are found in swamps and small pools in creek beds. They can tolerate very polluted water, and may be found in drainage pits. During winter, larvae are found in grassy pools alongside Aedes camptorhynchus. Eggs are laid in rafts, elongate-oval shaped. 190–302 eggs arranged in 11–14 rows.

The head of C. globocoxitus larvae is yellow, antennae brown. The comb consists of 44–50 scales arranged in four irregular rows. Single saddle hair. Anal papillae are short, between one half and two thirds the length of the saddle. A slender siphon with a slight curve to it. The number of pecten teeth vary between 11 and 15.
