= Ecological competence =

Ecological competence is a term that has several different meanings that are dependent on the context it is used. The term "Ecological competence" can be used in a microbial sense, and it can be used in a sociological sense.

== Microbiology ==
Ecological competence is the ability of an organism, often a pathogen, to survive and compete in new habitats. In the case of plant pathogens, it is also their ability to survive between growing seasons. For example, peanut clump virus can survive in the spores of its fungal vector until a new growing season begins and it can proceed to infect its primary host again. If a pathogen does not have ecological competence it is likely to become extinct. Bacteria and other pathogens can increase their ecological competence by creating a micro-niche, or a highly specialized environment that only they can survive in. This in turn will increase plasmid stability. Increased plasmid stability leads to a higher ecological competence due to added spatial organization and regulated cell protection.

Host competence, in particular, is the ability of a host to transmit infection to another susceptible host or vector effectively. It is defined as the proficiency with which a host transmits a parasite to another susceptible host or vector. It is a key determinant of epidemiological dynamics for parasites with more than one host. Vector organisms that can transmit parasites to more than one host are a risk for inter-species propagation of disease. For example, mosquitoes that bite multiple host species can transmit diseases from one to another. West Nile virus (WNV) is usually spread to human populations by mosquitoes that bite infected birds, then humans.

== Sociology ==
Ecological competence in a sociological sense is based around the relationship that humans have formed with the environment. It is often important in certain careers that will have a drastic impact on the surrounding ecosystem. A specific example is engineers working around and planning mining operations, due to the possible negative effects it can have on the surrounding environment. Ecological competence is especially important at the managerial level so that managers may understand society's risk to nature. These risks are learned through specific ecological knowledge so that the environment can be better protected in the future.

== See also ==
- Cultural ecology
- Environmental education
- Sustainable development
- Ecological relationship
