= Haemamoeba =

Scientific classification
- Domain: Eukaryota
- Supergroup: Alveolata
- Phylum: Apicomplexa
- Class: Aconoidasida
- Order: Haemospororida
- Family: Plasmodiidae
- Genus: Plasmodium
- Subgenus: Haemamoeba; Corradetti et al., 1963

Species
- See text

Subgenus of single-celled organisms

Haemamoeba is a subgenus of the genus Plasmodium — all of which are parasites. The subgenus was created in 1963 by Corradetti et al.. Species in this subgenus infect birds.

== Diagnostic features ==
Species in the subgenus Haemamoeba have the following characteristics:

Mature schizonts are larger than the host cell nucleus and commonly displace it.

Gametocytes are large, round, oval or irregular in shape and are substantially larger than the host nucleus.

== Species in this subgenus ==
- Plasmodium cathemerium
- Plasmodium coggeshalli
- Plasmodium elongatum
- Plasmodium gallinaceum
- Plasmodium giovannolai
- Plasmodium griffithsi
- Plasmodium lutzi
- Plasmodium matutinum
- Plasmodium parvulum
- Plasmodium relictum
- Plasmodium tejerai
