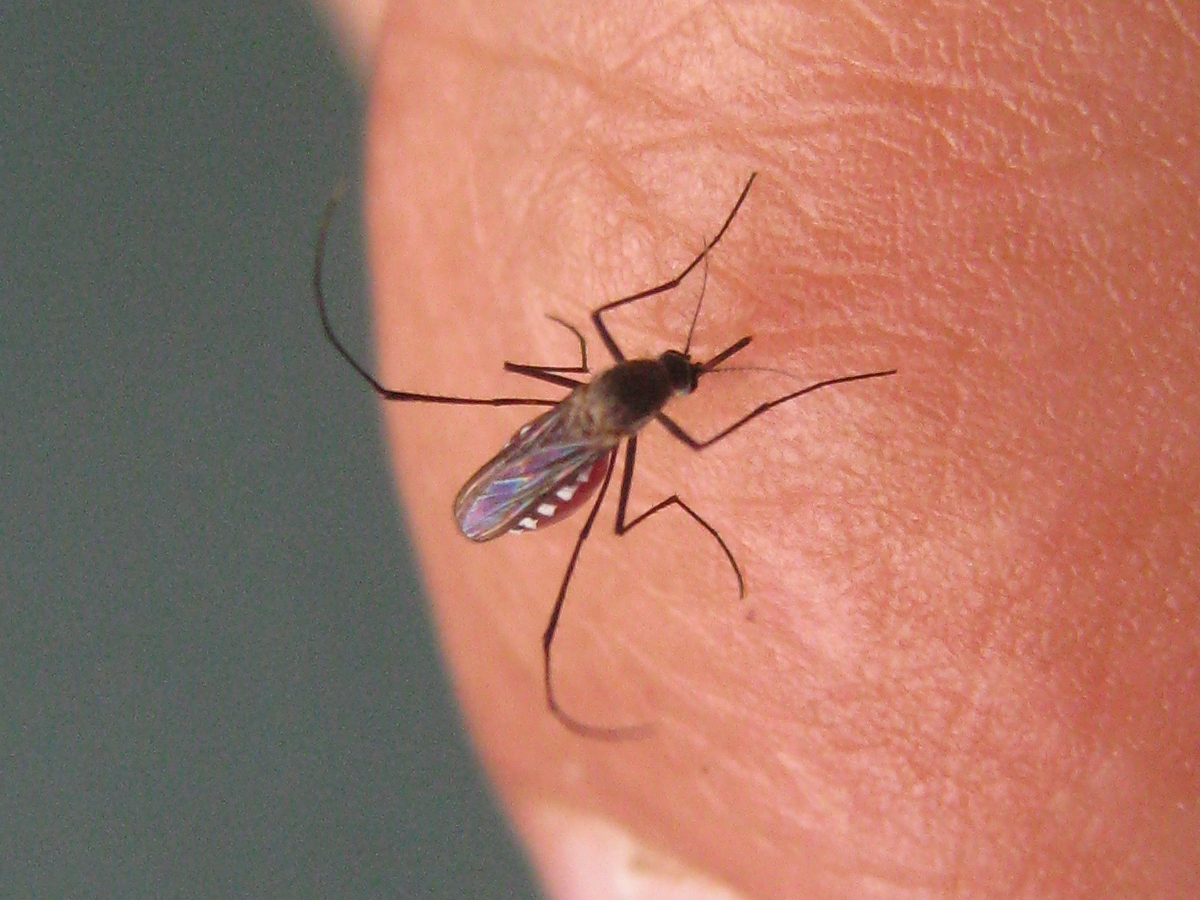

Scientific classification
- Kingdom: Animalia
- Phylum: Arthropoda
- Class: Insecta
- Order: Diptera
- Family: Culicidae
- Genus: Culex
- Species: C. australicus

Binomial name
- Culex australicus Dobrotworsky & Drummond, 1953

Synonyms
- Culex pipiens australicus

= Culex australicus =

Species of mosquito

Culex australicus is a species of mosquito within the genus Culex, and within the C. pipiens group. It is endemic to Australia, of which the city Melbourne, Victoria is its type locality.

Its common name is the Australian house mosquito.

Adult females feed on birds and small mammals and amphibians, but rarely bite human. They breed in open freshwater or slightly brackish sites with emergent vegetation, and are common in urban areas.

== Description ==
C. australicus is a medium-sized mosquito, brown and with an unbanded proboscis. The head is clothed with narrow, yellow scales on the vertex, darker behind the eye border. Torus and clypeus are bare; palp and dorsal portion of the proboscis dark. The scutal integument is a dark brown, clothed in fine bronze scales, pale above the wing root. Scales of the scutellum are long, narrow and creamy in colour. Pleura brown, anterior and posterior pronotums both white and brown scaled. A large portion of the rest of the thorax is covered by broad, flat white scales. Abdominal tergites black, white basal banding constricted laterally. Sternites pale and with elongate black median and apicolateral patches. White knee spot on the hind femur; tibiae and tarsi all dark.

== As a disease vector ==
While C. australicus is not known to transmit disease to humans, a single strain of MVEv was isolated from this species during the 1974 epidemic in Murray Valley. Kunijn and Sindbis viruses have also been isolated from it.
