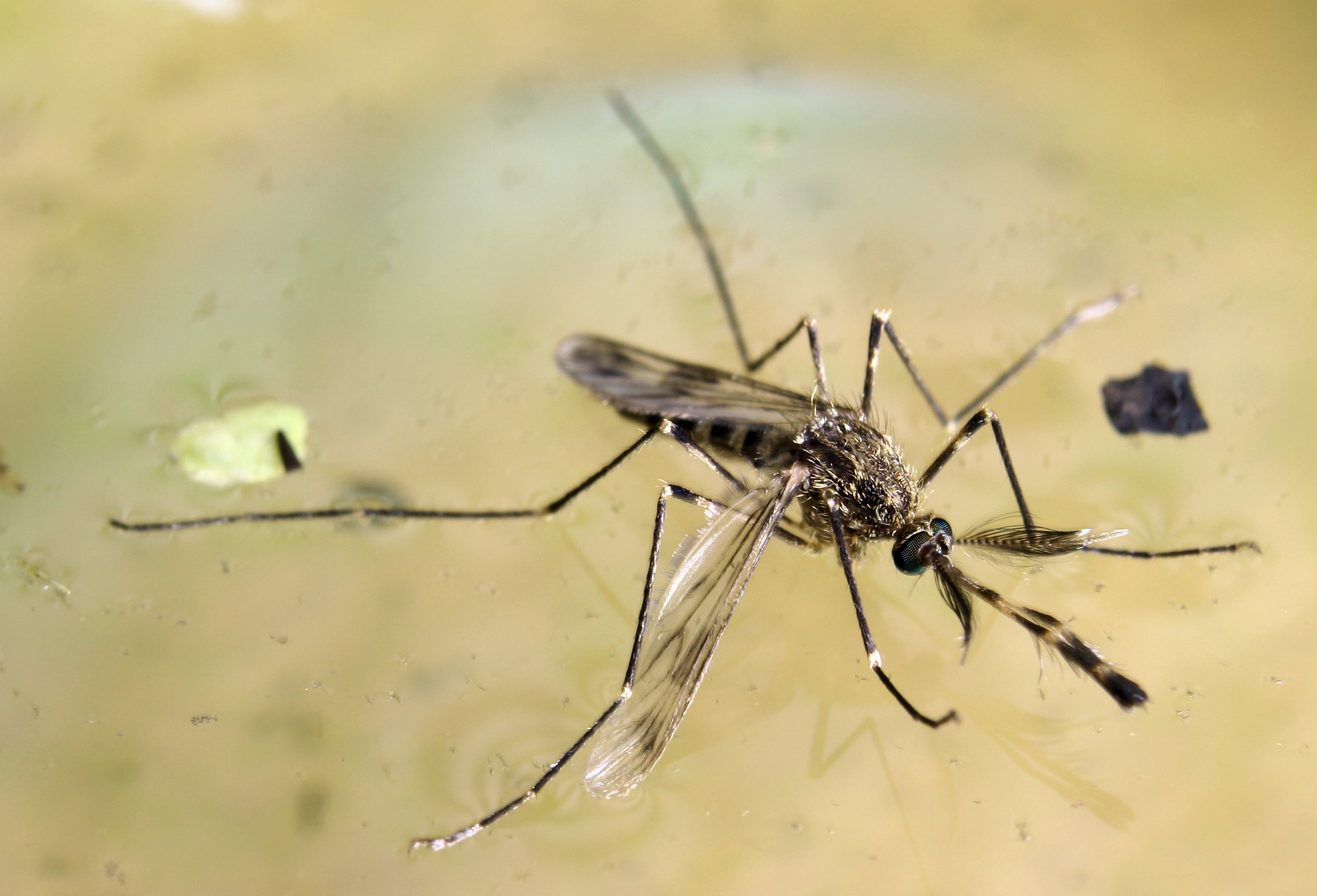

Scientific classification
- Kingdom: Animalia
- Phylum: Arthropoda
- Clade: Pancrustacea
- Class: Insecta
- Order: Diptera
- Family: Culicidae
- Genus: Culex
- Species: C. tarsalis

Binomial name
- Culex tarsalis Coquillett, 1896

= Culex tarsalis =

Mosquito species

Culex tarsalis, also known as Western Encephalitis Mosquito, is a mosquito species that appears across North America. The species has black and white banding on the legs.

The species is a major vector of Saint Louis encephalitis and Western equine encephalitis virus in the western USA. It is also a confirmed vector of West Nile virus.

In California urban environments, the abundance of Culex tarsalis increases following rainfall, and it has been identified as a potential vector not only for zoonotic viruses but also for avian malaria parasites, particularly Plasmodium species that infect wild birds.
