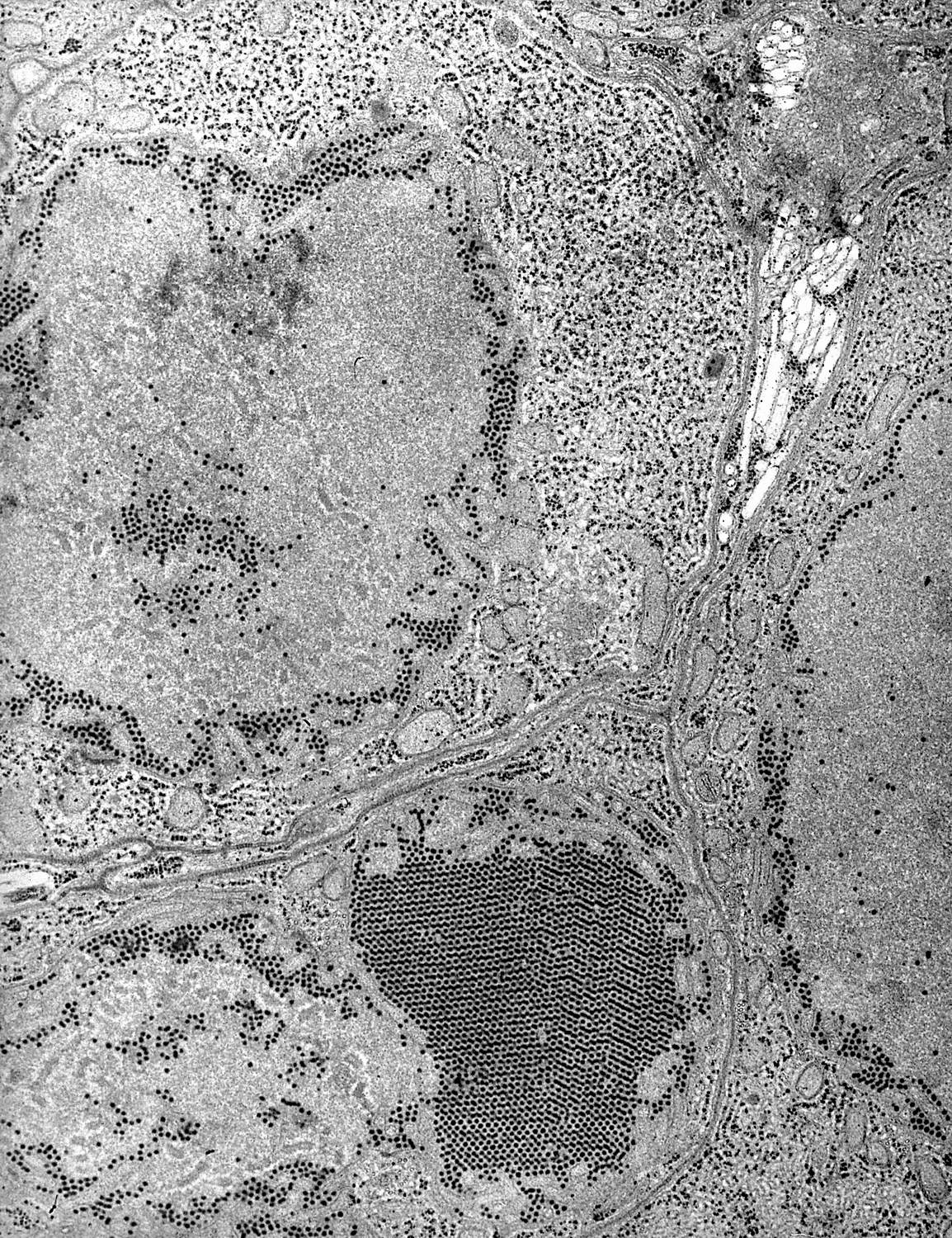
- Electron micrograph of Saint Louis encephalitis virus seen in a mosquito salivary gland

Virus classification
- (unranked): Virus
- Realm: Riboviria
- Kingdom: Orthornavirae
- Phylum: Kitrinoviricota
- Class: Flasuviricetes
- Order: Amarillovirales
- Family: Flaviviridae
- Genus: Orthoflavivirus
- Subgenus: Euflavivirus
- Species: Orthoflavivirus louisense

Synonyms
- St. Louis encephalitis virus; St. Louis virus

= Saint Louis encephalitis =

Saint Louis encephalitis virus

Mosquito-borne viral disease mainly in the US

Saint Louis encephalitis
- Specialty: Infectious diseases

Saint Louis encephalitis is a disease caused by the mosquito-borne Saint Louis encephalitis virus. Saint Louis encephalitis virus is a member of the family Flaviviridae related to West Nile virus and Japanese encephalitis virus. Saint Louis encephalitis virus is endemic to the New World and is present from southern Canada to Argentina, from the east coast and west coast of the United States, and in the Caribbean Islands.

== History ==
In 1933, an outbreak of encephalitis occurred in St. Louis, Missouri, and the neighboring St. Louis County with over 1,000 cases reported and 197 deaths. The newly constituted National Institutes of Health of the United States was appealed to for epidemiological and investigative expertise. The previously unknown virus that caused the epidemic was isolated by the NIH team first in monkeys and then in white mice.

Several human epidemics of Saint Louis encephalitis with more than 100 cases occurred between 1937 and 1990 in Illinois, Indiana, Ohio, Missouri, Mississippi, Texas, and Florida.

On August 8, 2001, an outbreak of this disease prompted an emergency alert in Louisiana after 63 cases were reported.

Since West Nile virus was introduced to the United States, incidence of Saint Louis encephalitis has decreased significantly and, in some parts of the United States, West Nile virus has replaced Saint Louis encephalitis virus.

== Signs and symptoms ==
The majority of infections do not result in disease or cause mild illness, including fever and headache. In more severe cases, symptoms may include headache, high fever, neck stiffness, stupor, disorientation, coma, tremors, occasional convulsions and spastic paralysis. Case fatality rate ranges from 4–27%. Severe cases are more likely in individuals over 75 years old who were not previously exposed to infection.

== Treatment ==
There are no vaccines or treatments specifically for Saint Louis encephalitis, although one study showed that early use of interferon alfa-2b may decrease the severity of complications.

== Transmission ==
Saint Louis encephalitis virus circulates between mosquitoes, primarily from the genus Culex, and birds, mainly in the orders Passeriformes and Columbiformes. The most common vector of this disease within the genus Culex is Culex pipiens, also known as the common or northern house mosquito, and Culex quinquefasciatus, the southern house mosquito. Other Culex vectors include Culex tarsalis, primarily in the western United States, and Culex nigripalpis in Florida. The Saint Louis encephalitis virus requires temperatures above 22°C to replicate in mosquitoes.

Humans are dead end hosts for Saint Louis encephalitis virus, while infected mosquitoes can transmit the Saint Louis encephalitis virus to humans during the feeding process, humans cannot transmit the virus back into a mosquito.

== Epidemiology ==
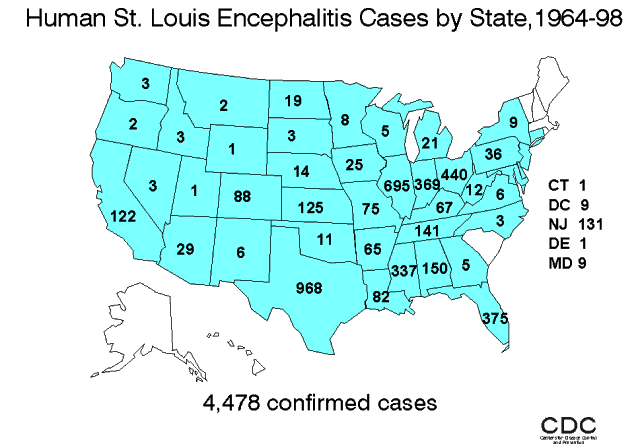
Human incidence of Saint Louis encephalitis in the United States, 1964–1998.

Between 1976 and 2001, an average of 57 cases of Saint Louis encephalitis were recorded by the CDC. Between 2003 and 2023, an average of 14 cases of Saint Louis encephalitis cases were recorded by the CDC. Human cases of Saint Louis encephalitis occur primarily in the late summer or early fall. Urban outbreaks are more likely to occur when a dry summer follows a warmer spring and water remains pooled in drainage systems where Culex breed.

== Genetics ==
Five evolutionary genetic studies of SLE virus have been published of which four focused on phylogeny, genetic variation, and recombination dynamics by sequencing the envelope protein gene and parts of other genes.

A recent evolutionary study based on 23 new full open reading frame sequences (near-complete genomes) found that the North American strains belonged to a single clade. Strains were isolated at different points in time (from 1933 to 2001) which allowed for the estimation of divergence times of SLE virus clades and the overall evolutionary rate. Furthermore, this study found an increase in the effective population size of the SLE virus around the end of the 19th century that corresponds to the split of the latest North American clade, suggesting a northwards colonization of SLE virus in the Americas, and a split from the ancestral South American strains around 1892. Scans for natural selection showed that most codons of the SLE virus ORF were evolving neutrally or under negative selection. Positive selection was statistically detected only at one single codon coding for amino acids belonging to the hypothesized N-linked glycosylation site of the envelope protein. Nevertheless, the latter can be due to selection in vitro (laboratory) rather than in vivo (host). In an independent study, 14 out of 106 examined envelope gene sequences were found not to contain a specific codon at position 156 coding for this glycosylation site (Ser→Phe/Tyr).

Another study estimated the evolutionary rate to be 4.1 × 10^{−4} substitutions/site/year (95% confidence internal 2.5-5.7 × 10^{−4} substitutions/site/year).
