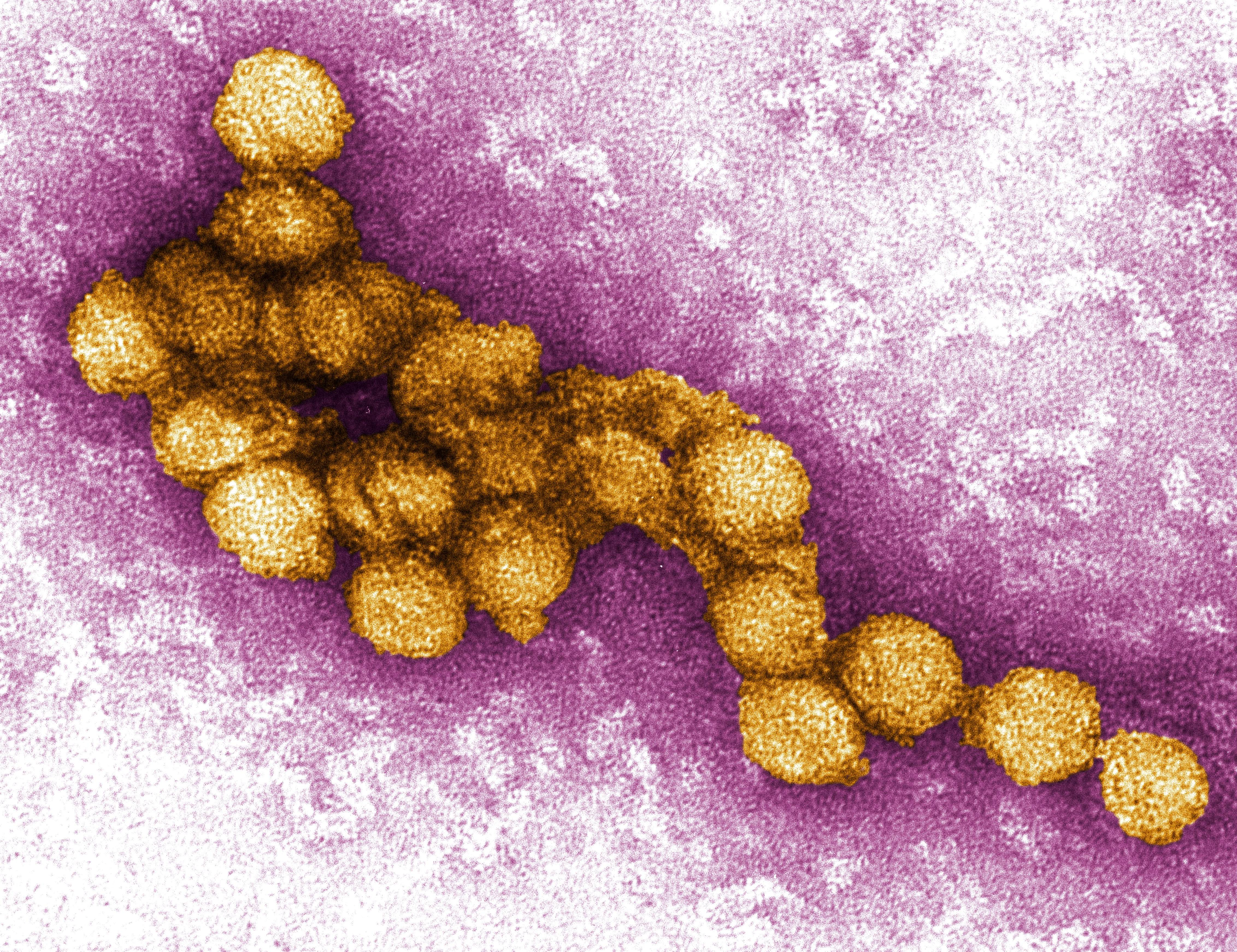
- A micrograph of the West Nile Virus, appearing in yellow

Virus classification
- (unranked): Virus
- Realm: Riboviria
- Kingdom: Orthornavirae
- Phylum: Kitrinoviricota
- Class: Flasuviricetes
- Order: Amarillovirales
- Family: Flaviviridae
- Genus: Orthoflavivirus
- Subgenus: Euflavivirus
- Species: Orthoflavivirus nilense

= West Nile virus =

Species of flavivirus causing West Nile fever

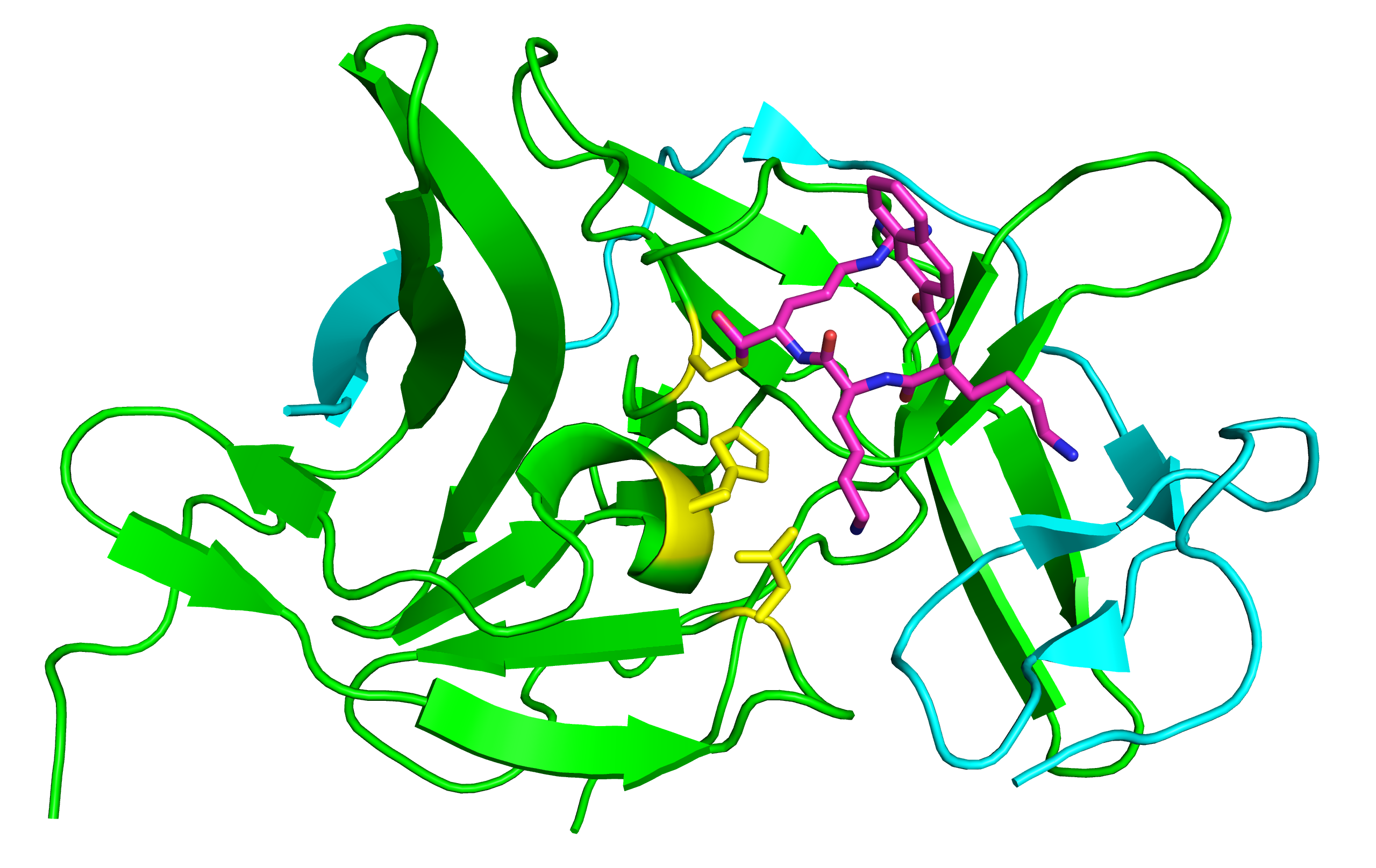
Ribbon representation of the NS2B/NS3 protease of West Nile virus

West Nile virus (WNV) is a single-stranded RNA virus that causes West Nile fever. It is a member of the family Flaviviridae, from the genus Orthoflavivirus, which also contains the Zika virus, dengue virus, and yellow fever virus. The virus is primarily transmitted by mosquitoes, mostly species of Culex. The primary hosts of WNV are birds, so that the virus remains within a "bird–mosquito–bird" transmission cycle. The virus is genetically related to the Japanese encephalitis family of viruses. Humans and horses both exhibit disease symptoms from the virus, and symptoms rarely occur in other animals.

West Nile virus was not named directly after the Nile River, but after the West Nile district of Uganda where the virus was first isolated in 1937.

== Structure ==
Like most other flaviviruses, WNV is an enveloped virus with icosahedral symmetry. Electron microscope studies reveal a 45–50 nm virion covered with a relatively smooth protein shell; this structure is similar to the dengue fever virus, another Flavivirus. The protein shell is made of two structural proteins: the glycoprotein E and the small membrane protein M. Protein E has numerous functions including receptor binding, viral attachment, and entry into the cell through membrane fusion.

The outer protein shell is covered by a host-derived lipid membrane, the viral envelope. The flavivirus lipid membrane has been found to contain cholesterol and phosphatidylserine, but other elements of the membrane have yet to be identified. The lipid membrane has many roles in viral infection, including acting as signaling molecules and enhancing entry into the cell. Cholesterol, in particular, plays an integral part in WNV entering a host cell. The two viral envelope proteins, E and M, are inserted into the membrane.

The RNA genome is bound to capsid (C) proteins, which are 105 amino-acid residues long, to form the nucleocapsid. The capsid proteins are one of the first proteins created in an infected cell; the capsid protein is a structural protein whose main purpose is to package RNA into the developing viruses. The capsid has been found to prevent apoptosis by affecting the Akt pathway.

=== Genome ===
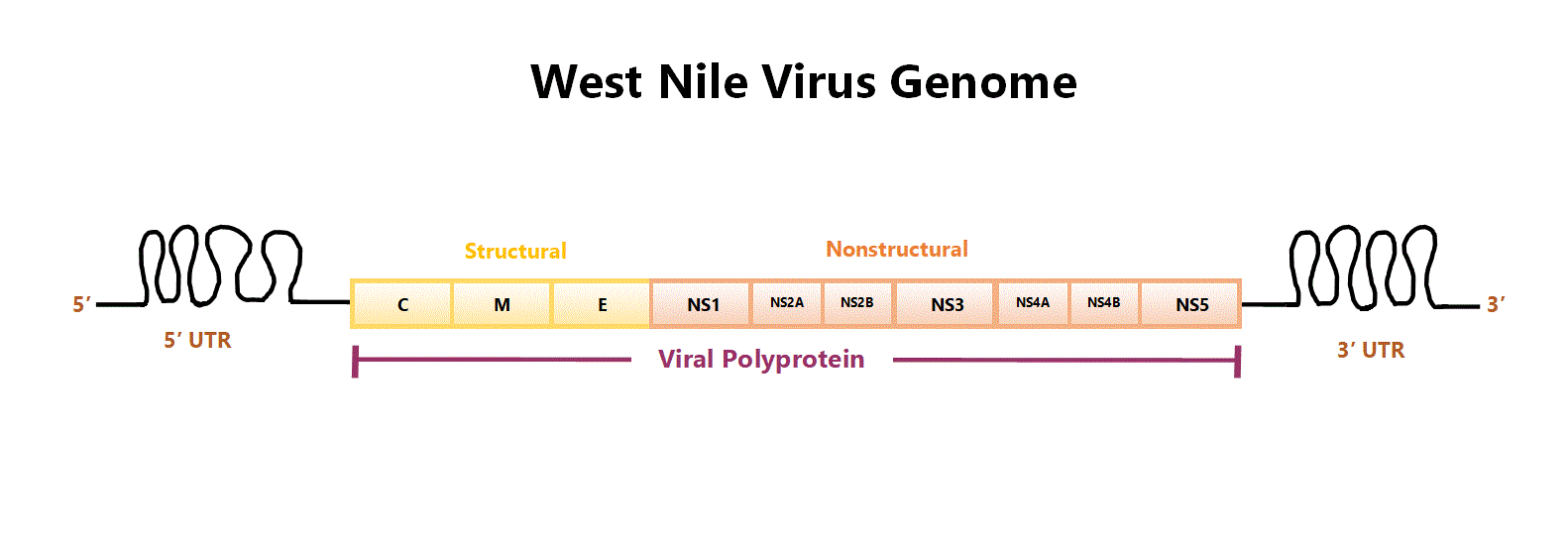
The West Nile virus genome. Modified after Guzman et al. 2010.

WNV is a positive-sense, single-stranded RNA virus. Its genome is approximately 11,000 nucleotides long and is flanked by 5′ and 3′ non-coding stem loop structures. The coding region of the genome codes for three structural proteins and seven nonstructural (NS) proteins, proteins that are not incorporated into the structure of new viruses. The WNV genome is first translated into a polyprotein and later cleaved by virus and host proteases into separate proteins (i.e. NS1, C, E).

=== Structural proteins ===
Structural proteins (C, prM/M, E) are capsid, precursor membrane proteins, and envelope proteins, respectively. The structural proteins are located at the 5′ end of the genome and are cleaved into mature proteins by both host and viral proteases.

Structural Protein	Function
C	Capsid protein; encloses the RNA genome, packages RNA into immature virions.
prM/M	Viruses with M protein are infectious: the presence of M protein allows for the activation of proteins involved in viral entry into the cell. prM (precursor membrane) protein is present on immature virions, by further cleavage by furin to M protein, the virions become infectious.
E	A glycoprotein that forms the viral envelope, binds to receptors on the host cell surface in order to enter the cell.

=== Nonstructural proteins ===
Nonstructural proteins consist of NS1, NS2A, NS2B, NS3, NS4A, NS4B, and NS5. These proteins mainly assist with viral replication or act as proteases. The nonstructural proteins are located near the 3′ end of the genome.

Nonstructural Protein	Function
NS1	NS1 is a cofactor for viral replication, specifically for regulation of the replication complex.
NS2A	NS2A has a variety of functions: it is involved in viral replication, virion assembly, and inducing host cell death.
NS2B	A cofactor for NS3 and together forms the NS2B-NS3 protease complex. Contains transmembrane domains which bind the protease to intracellular membranes.
NS3	A serine protease that is responsible for cleaving the polyprotein to produce mature proteins; it also acts as a helicase.
NS4A	NS4A is a cofactor for viral replication, specifically regulates the activity of the NS3 helicase.
NS4B	Inhibits interferon signaling.
NS5	The largest and most conserved protein of WNV, NS5 acts as a methyltransferase and a RNA polymerase, though it lacks proofreading properties.

==== Dinucleotide composition and host adaptation ====
CpG and UpA are dinucleotides that influence West Nile virus genome composition and host-specific replication. Vertebrate genomes suppress CpG and UpA dinucleotides, imposing selective pressure on viruses that infect these hosts. As a result, West Nile virus suppresses CpG and UpA nucleotide frequencies in its genome, reflecting adaptation to vertebrate antiviral pressures.

In vertebrates (mammals), elevated CpG frequencies in viral RNA are recognized by zinc-finger antiviral protein (ZAP). ZAP binds to CpG-rich single-stranded RNA sequences in the cytoplasm of vertebrate cells and recruits additional host factors that degrade viral RNA, inhibit translation, and activate innate immune pathways and thereby suppressing virus replication. In contrast, attenuation associated with increased UpA frequencies occurs through unknown ZAP-independent mechanisms.

In Invertebrate vectors like mosquitoes, CpG and UpA dinucleotide levels are not strongly suppressed, and viruses with elevated levels of these dinucleotides can replicate normally in mosquito cells. This difference in host selective pressures allows researchers to control the attenuation of West Nile virus by increasing dinucleotide frequencies through synonymous genome recoding and analysing their effects in both environments. These findings show how dinucleotide composition contributes to host adaptation in arboviruses and have implications for strategies in potential vaccine development.

To investigate the effects of increasing dinucleotide composition without disrupting the essential viral functions, this particular study chose two regions within the virus's genome for introducing synonymous mutations- NS3-NS4A and NS4A-NS5. These regions lack critical RNA structures, have high synonymous variability, are more tolerant to nucleotide changes and can be recorded without breaking viral replication, and are large enough to manipulate CpG and UpA frequencies, thereby preserving viral replication competence.

== Life cycle ==
Once WNV has successfully entered the bloodstream of a host animal, the envelope protein, E, binds to attachment factors called glycosaminoglycans on the host cell. These attachment factors aid entry into the cell, however, binding to primary receptors is also necessary. Primary receptors include DC-SIGN, DC-SIGN-R, and the integrin α_{v}β_{3}. By binding to these primary receptors, WNV enters the cell through clathrin-mediated endocytosis. As a result of endocytosis, WNV enters the cell within an endosome.

The acidity of the endosome catalyzes the fusion of the endosomal and viral membranes, allowing the genome to be released into the cytoplasm. Translation of the positive-sense single-stranded RNA occurs at the endoplasmic reticulum; the RNA is translated into a polyprotein which is then cleaved by both host and viral proteases NS2B-NS3 to produce mature proteins.

In order to replicate its genome, NS5, a RNA polymerase, forms a replication complex with other nonstructural proteins to produce an intermediary negative-sense single-stranded RNA; the negative-sense strand serves as a template for synthesis of the final positive-sense RNA. Once the positive-sense RNA has been synthesized, the capsid protein, C, encloses the RNA strands into immature virions. The rest of the virus is assembled along the endoplasmic reticulum and through the Golgi apparatus, and results in non-infectious immature virions. The E protein is then glycosylated and prM is cleaved by furin, a host cell protease, into the M protein, thereby producing an infectious mature virion. The mature viruses are then secreted out of the cell.

== Phylogeny ==
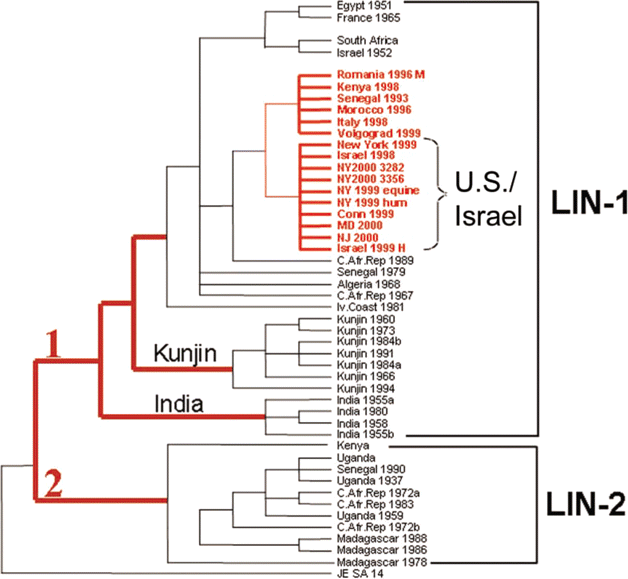
Phylogenetic tree of West Nile viruses based on sequencing of the envelope gene during complete genome sequencing of the virus

WNV is one of the Japanese encephalitis antigenic serocomplex of viruses, together with Japanese encephalitis virus, Murray Valley encephalitis virus, Saint Louis encephalitis virus and some other flaviviruses. Studies of phylogenetic lineages have determined that WNV emerged as a distinct virus around 1000 years ago. This initial virus developed into two distinct lineages. Lineage 1 and its multiple profiles is the source of the epidemic transmission in Africa and throughout the world. Lineage 2 was considered an African zoonosis. However, in 2008, lineage 2, previously only seen in horses in sub-Saharan Africa and Madagascar, began to appear in horses in Europe, where the first known outbreak affected 18 animals in Hungary. Lineage 1 West Nile virus was detected in South Africa in 2010 in a mare and her aborted fetus; previously, only lineage 2 West Nile virus had been detected in horses and humans in South Africa. Kunjin virus is a subtype of West Nile virus endemic to Oceania. A 2007 fatal case in a killer whale in Texas broadened the known host range of West Nile virus to include cetaceans.

Since the first North American cases in 1999, the virus has been reported throughout the United States, Canada, Mexico, the Caribbean, and Central America. There have been human cases and equine cases, and many birds are infected. The Barbary macaque, Macaca sylvanus, was the first nonhuman primate to contract WNV. Both the American and Israeli strains are marked by high mortality rates in infected avian populations; the presence of dead birds—especially Corvidae—can be an early indicator of the arrival of the virus.

== Host range and transmission ==
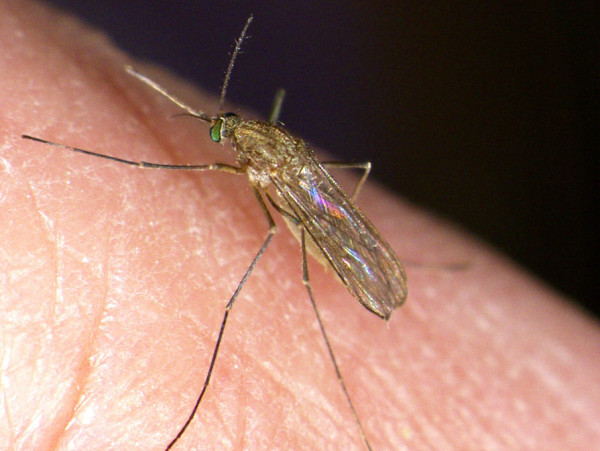
Culex pipiens mosquitoes are a vector for WNV.

The natural hosts for WNV are birds and mosquitoes. Over 300 different species of bird have been shown to be infected with the virus. Some birds, including the American crow (Corvus brachyrhynchos), blue jay (Cyanocitta cristata) and greater sage-grouse (Centrocercus urophasianus), are killed by the infection, but others survive. The American robin (Turdus migratorius) and house sparrow (Passer domesticus) are thought to be among the most important reservoir species in North American and European cities. Brown thrashers (Toxostoma rufum), gray catbirds (Dumetella carolinensis), northern cardinals (Cardinalis cardinalis), northern mockingbirds (Mimus polyglottos), wood thrushes (Hylocichla mustelina) and the dove family are among the other common North American birds in which high levels of antibodies against WNV have been found.

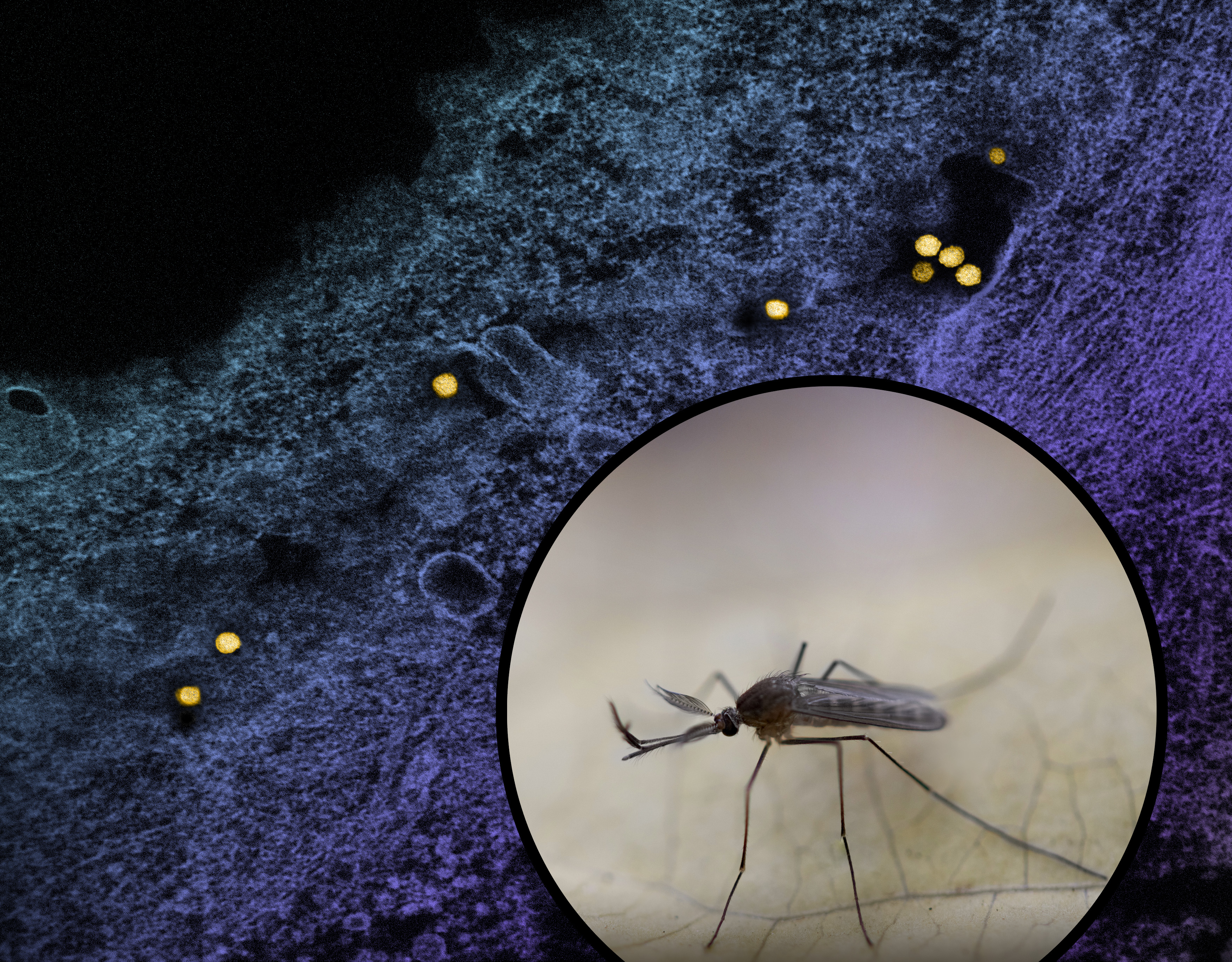
A male Culex mosquito (foreground/bottom right) and a transmission electron micrograph showing West Nile virus particles (colorized yellow) within an infected cell. Source: NIAID Flickr https://www.flickr.com/photos/niaid/

WNV has been demonstrated in a large number of mosquito species, but the most significant for viral transmission are Culex species that feed on birds, including Culex pipiens, C. restuans, C. salinarius, C. quinquefasciatus, C. nigripalpus, C. erraticus and C. tarsalis. Experimental infection has also been demonstrated with soft tick vectors, but is unlikely to be important in natural transmission.

WNV has a broad host range, and is also known to be able to infect at least 30 mammalian species, including humans, some non-human primates, horses, dogs and cats. Some infected humans and horses experience disease but dogs and cats rarely show symptoms. Reptiles and amphibians can also be infected, including some species of crocodiles, alligators, snakes, lizards and frogs. Mammals are considered incidental or dead-end hosts for the virus: they do not usually develop a high enough level of virus in the blood (viremia) to infect another mosquito feeding on them and carry on the transmission cycle; some birds are also dead-end hosts.

In the normal rural or enzootic transmission cycle, the virus alternates between the bird reservoir and the mosquito vector. It can also be transmitted between birds via direct contact, by eating an infected bird carcass or by drinking infected water. Vertical transmission between female and offspring is possible in mosquitoes, and might potentially be important in overwintering. In the urban or spillover cycle, infected mosquitoes that have fed on infected birds transmit the virus to humans. This requires mosquito species that bite both birds and humans, which are termed bridge vectors. The virus can also rarely be spread through blood transfusions, organ transplants, or from mother to baby during pregnancy, delivery, or breastfeeding. Unlike in birds, it does not otherwise spread directly between people.

== Disease ==
=== Humans ===
West Nile fever is an infection by the West Nile virus, which is typically spread by mosquitoes. In about 80% of infections people have few or no symptoms. About 20% of people develop a fever, headache, vomiting, or a rash. In less than 1% of people, encephalitis or meningitis occurs, with associated neck stiffness, confusion, or seizures. Recovery may take weeks to months. The risk of death among those in whom the nervous system is affected is about 10%.

West Nile virus (WNV) is usually spread by mosquitoes that become infected when they feed on infected birds. Birds often carry the disease. Rarely the virus is spread through blood transfusions, organ transplants, or from mother to baby during pregnancy, delivery, or breastfeeding, but it otherwise does not spread directly between people. Risks for severe disease include being very young, over 60 years old, having a weak immune system, and having other health problems. Diagnosis is typically based on symptoms and blood tests.

There is no human vaccine. The best way to reduce the risk of infection is to avoid mosquito bites. Mosquito populations may be reduced by eliminating standing pools of water, such as in old tires, buckets, gutters, and swimming pools. When mosquitoes cannot be avoided, mosquito repellent, window screens, and mosquito nets reduce the likelihood of being bitten. There is no specific treatment for the disease; pain medications may reduce symptoms.

The virus was discovered in Uganda in 1937, and was first detected in North America in 1999. WNV has occurred in Europe, Africa, Asia, Australia, and North America. In the United States thousands of cases are reported a year, with most occurring in August and September. It can occur in outbreaks of disease. Severe disease may also occur in horses, for which a vaccine is available. A surveillance system in birds is useful for early detection of a potential human outbreak.

=== Horses ===
Severe disease may also occur in horses. Several vaccines for these animals are now available. Before the availability of veterinary vaccines, around 40% of horses infected in North America died.

== Epidemiology ==
According to the Centers for Disease Control and Prevention, infection with West Nile Virus is seasonal in temperate zones. Climates that are temperate, such as those in the United States and Europe, see peak season from July to October. Peak season changes depending on geographic region and warmer and humid climates can see longer peak seasons. All ages are equally likely to be infected but there is a higher amount of death and neuroinvasive West Nile Virus in people 60–89 years old. People of older age are more likely to have adverse effects.

There are several modes of transmission, but the most common cause of infection in humans is by being bitten by an infected mosquito. Other modes of transmission include blood transfusion, organ transplantation, breast-feeding, transplacental transmission, and laboratory acquisition. These alternative modes of transmission are extremely rare.

== Prevention ==
Prevention efforts against WNV mainly focus on preventing human contact with and being bitten by infected mosquitoes. This is twofold, first by personal protective actions and second by mosquito-control actions. When a person is in an area that has WNV, it is important to avoid outdoor activity, and if they go outside they should use a mosquito repellent with DEET. A person can also wear clothing that covers more skin, such as long sleeves and pants. Mosquito control can be done at the community level and include surveillance programs and control programs including pesticides and reducing mosquito habitats. This includes draining standing water. Surveillance systems in birds is particularly useful. If dead birds are found in a neighborhood, the event should be reported to local authorities. This may help health departments do surveillance and determine if the birds are infected with West Nile Virus.

Despite the commercial availability of four veterinary vaccines for horses, no human vaccine has progressed beyond phase II clinical trials. Efforts have been made to produce a vaccine for human use and several candidates have been produced, but none are licensed to use. The best method to reduce the risk of infections is avoiding mosquito bites. This may be done by eliminating standing pools of water, such as in old tires, buckets, gutters, and swimming pools. Mosquito repellent, window screens, mosquito nets, and avoiding areas where mosquitoes occur may also be useful.

=== Surveillance-guided mosquito control ===
==== Surveillance and assessment of transmission risk ====
Public health authorities monitor mosquito populations to identify areas where West Nile virus (WNV) transmission may be increasing. This includes measuring mosquito numbers and testing collected mosquitoes for the virus. Surveillance findings can provide an early indication of increased transmission risk before changes in reported human cases become apparent. The Centers for Disease Control and Prevention (CDC) notes that environmental surveillance, when considered alongside evidence of infection in birds and other animals and historical surveillance data, can help identify conditions associated with increased risk of human infection two to four weeks before disease onset.

One measure used in mosquito surveillance is the Vector Index (VI), which estimates the abundance of infected mosquitoes in an area. It combines the number of mosquitoes collected during trapping with the estimated proportion carrying WNV. A 2025 systematic review of 38 studies found that estimates of mosquito infection rates were significantly associated with human WNV infections in 13 of the 16 locations where they were assessed. The Vector Index performed successfully in 24 of the 30 locations where it was evaluated. The authors concluded that surveillance measures used to estimate human infection risk should account for the presence of the virus in mosquitoes. They also noted that differences in study methods and locations limited the use of a single approach across different regions.

==== Using surveillance to guide mosquito control ====
Public health authorities use surveillance findings to decide when and where mosquito control measures are needed. Control programmes may establish action thresholds based on mosquito numbers and infection rates to determine when additional measures should be introduced. These thresholds can help authorities respond to increasing transmission before human cases are reported. However, meaningful action thresholds are not routinely used in mosquito control programmes, and the relationship between surveillance findings and human infection risk requires further study. Conditions that influence mosquito populations and virus transmission also vary between locations, so thresholds may need to be adapted to local conditions.

Control measures may target mosquito larvae or adult mosquitoes, depending on local conditions and the level of virus activity. The CDC notes that larval control alone may not stop an outbreak once virus activity has reached levels associated with human infections. In these circumstances, adult mosquito control may also be needed to reduce the number of infected mosquitoes.

==== Evaluating control effectiveness ====
Mosquito surveillance also helps authorities determine whether control measures are working. Changes in mosquito numbers and infection rates can be monitored following an intervention. If control measures are ineffective, possible causes include untreated breeding sites, equipment failure or resistance to insecticides. Resistance occurs when mosquitoes become less susceptible to chemicals used to control them. Testing mosquito populations for resistance can help authorities determine whether their control methods remain effective.

A reduction in mosquito numbers does not necessarily mean that human infections have also decreased. Nasci and Mutebi noted that relatively few studies had directly assessed the effects of mosquito control programmes on human WNV infections. Further evaluation of human disease outcomes is needed to determine whether reductions in mosquito populations translate into meaningful reductions in human infection risk.

== Climate change ==
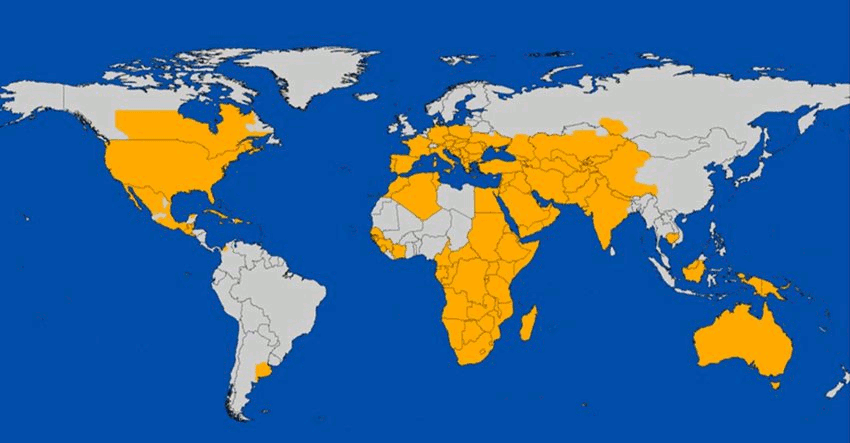
Global distribution of West Nile Virus from the CDC

Like other tropical diseases which are expected to have increased spread due to climate change, there is concern that changing weather conditions will increase West Nile Virus spread. Climate change will affect disease rates, ranges, and seasonality and affects the distribution of West Nile Virus.

Projected changes in flood frequency and severity can bring new challenges in flood risk management, allowing for increased mosquito populations in urban areas. Weather conditions affected by climate change including temperature, precipitation and wind may affect the survival and reproduction rates of mosquitoes, suitable habitats, distribution, and abundance. Ambient temperatures drive mosquito replication rates and transmission of WNV by affecting the peak season of mosquitoes and geographic variations. For example, increased temperatures can affect the rate of virus replication, speed up the virus evolution rate, and viral transmission efficiency. Furthermore, higher winter temperatures and warmer spring may lead to larger summer mosquito populations, increasing the risk for WNV. Similarly, rainfall may also drive mosquito replication rates and affect the seasonality and geographic variations of the virus. Studies show an association between heavy precipitation and higher incidence of reported WNV. Likewise, wind is another environmental factor that serves as a dispersal mechanism for mosquitoes.

Mosquitoes have extremely wide environmental tolerances and a nearly ubiquitous geographical distribution, being present on all major land masses except Antarctica and Iceland. Nevertheless, changes in climate and land use on ecological timescales can variously expand or fragment their distribution patterns, raising consequent concerns for human health.

== See also ==
- West Nile fever
- West Nile virus in the United States
