= Culex stigmatosoma =

Scientific classification
- Domain: Eukaryota
- Kingdom: Animalia
- Phylum: Arthropoda
- Class: Insecta
- Order: Diptera
- Family: Culicidae
- Genus: Culex
- Species: C. stigmatosoma

Binomial name
- Culex stigmatosoma Dyar 1907

Mosquito species

Culex stigmatosoma is a mosquito species that appears in Southern California, Oregon, and Texas. It is a confirmed vector of West Nile virus.
