= Plasmodium relictum =

Scientific classification
- Domain: Eukaryota
- Clade: Sar
- Clade: Alveolata
- Phylum: Apicomplexa
- Class: Aconoidasida
- Order: Haemospororida
- Family: Plasmodiidae
- Genus: Plasmodium
- Subgenus: Haemamoeba
- Species: P. relictum

Binomial name
- Plasmodium relictum Grassi & Feletti, 1891

Synonyms
- Haemamoeba majoris Laveran, 1902 (partim); Haemamoeba relicta Grassi and Feletti, 1891; Haemoproteus alaudae Celli and Sanfelice, 1891 (partim); Plasmodium alaudae (Celli and Sanfelice, 1891) emend. Garnham, 1966; Plasmodium biziurae (Gilruth, Sweet and Dodd, 1910) emend. Coatney and Roudabush, 1936; Plasmodium capistrani Russell, 1932; Plasmodium chloropsidis Mello, 1935; Plasmodium grassii Labbé, 1894, emend. Coatney and Roudabush, 1936; Plasmodium inconstans Hartman, 1927; Plasmodium maior Raffaele, 1930; Plasmodium majoris Lühe, 1906; Plasmodium muniae (Das Gupta and Siddons, 1941) emend. Garnham, 1966; Plasmodium paddae Brumpt, 1935; Plasmodium passeris Johnston and Cleland, 1909; Plasmodium pericrocoti Chakravarty and Kar, 1945; Plasmodium ploceii Chakravarty and Kar, 1945; Plasmodium praecox var. muniae Das Gupta and Siddons, 1941; Plasmodium relictum biziurae Gilruth, Sweet and Dodd, 1910, emend. Garnham, 1966; Plasmodium relictum capistranoae Russell, 1932, emend. Garnham, 1966; Plasmodium relictum spheniscidae Fantham and Porter, 1944, emend. Garnham, 1966; Plasmodium relictum var. spheniscidae Fantham and Porter, 1944; Proteosoma biziurae Gilruth, Sweet and Dodd, 1910; Proteosoma grassii Labbé, 1894

Species of single-celled organism

Plasmodium relictum is a species in the genus Plasmodium, subgenus Haemamoeba.

It is a parasite, and the most common cause of malaria in birds.

Like all Plasmodium species, P. relictum has both vertebrate and insect hosts. The vertebrate hosts for this parasite are birds.

== Distribution ==
P. relictum is geographically widespread, and is the most widespread malaria parasite of birds. Climate change is broadening its distribution further and is expected to continue to do so, including into higher elevations.

== Hosts ==
=== Avian ===
P. relictum infects a wide variety of birds including birds from various orders. Infections in numerous wild birds and experimental animals have been described including partridges, canaries, chickens, ducks, pigeons and Spheniscus magellanicus (Magellanic penguins). Experimental attempts to infect owls were not successful, suggesting owls may not be susceptible to P. relictum.

=== Vector ===
Culex quinquefasciatus, Cu. stigmatosoma and Cu. tarsalis.
