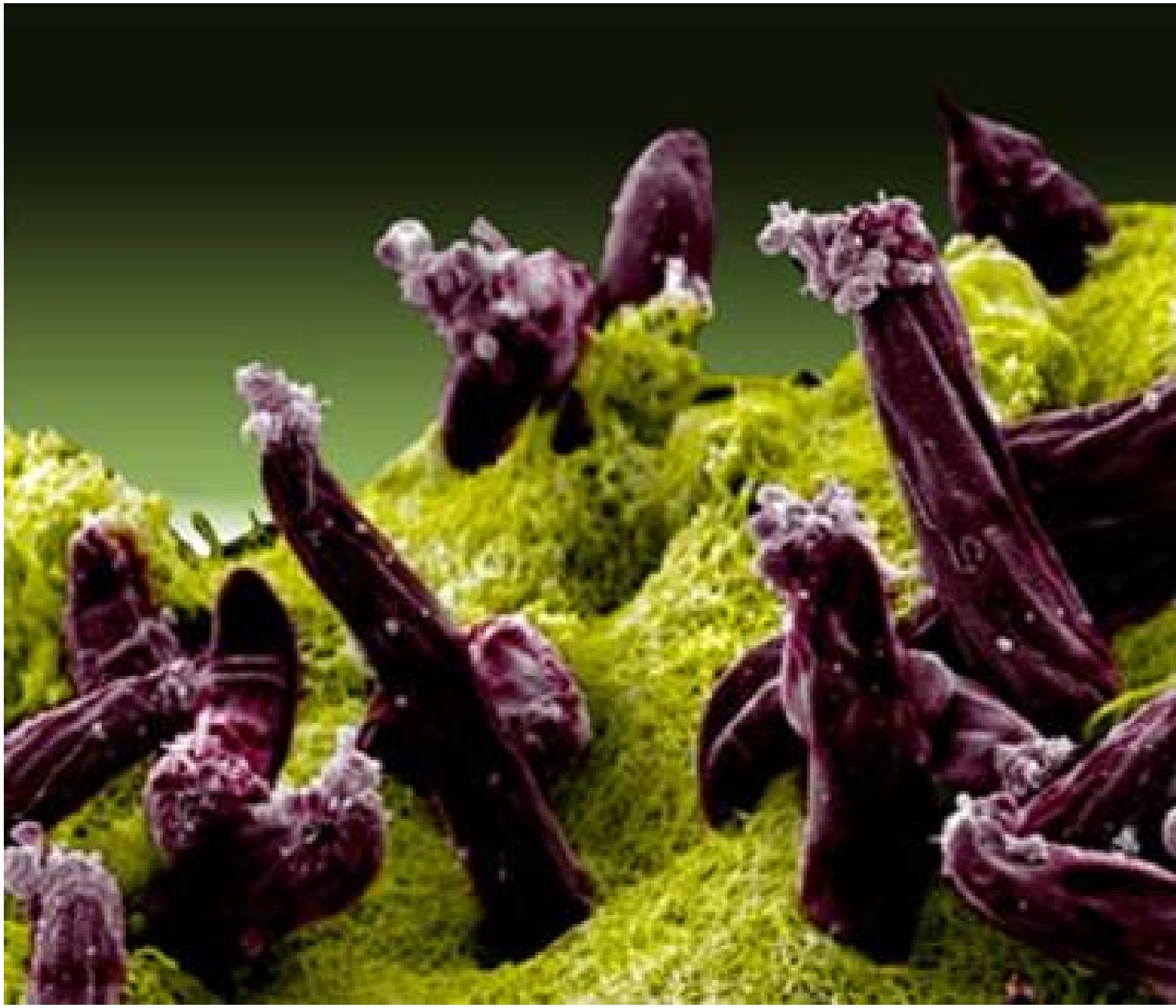
- Scanning electron micrograph of invading mosquito midgut

Scientific classification
- Domain: Eukaryota
- Clade: Sar
- Clade: Alveolata
- Phylum: Apicomplexa
- Class: Aconoidasida
- Order: Haemospororida
- Family: Plasmodiidae
- Genus: Plasmodium
- Species: P. gallinaceum

Binomial name
- Plasmodium gallinaceum Brumpt, 1935

= Plasmodium gallinaceum =

Bird malaria, including chicken

Plasmodium gallinaceum is a species of the genus Plasmodium (subgenus Haemamoeba) that causes malaria in poultry.

== Description ==
This species was described from samples in 1935 by Alexandre Joseph Emile Brumpt, a French professor of parasitology. The following year, Brumpt isolated viable material during a trip to Ceylon (now Sri Lanka).

=== Stages ===
Oocysts must develop inside the vector host. They are not transmissible – if they enter an avian host they will not develop.

Sporozoites are the transmission stage. If they enter an avian host they may infect.

== Vectors ==
Aedes aegypti is a vector.

P. gallinaceum manipulates A. aegypti to increase its own chances of success. Koella et al., 2002 finds that oocysts in the gut increase the volume of each blood meal. This lowers the chances of disgorgement of the parasites into the final host – chicken (Gallus gallus domesticus) – which is important because oocysts can't infect. This prolongs the average duration of oocyst residence in the vector, increasing their chance of successfully maturing to the transmission stage.

On the other hand sporozoites do the opposite: They decrease the volume of meals, increasing the number of meals taken, shortening the time they must continue to be in the vector, and increasing their chance of being successfully disgorged into a final host. Because this is the transmittable (infectious) stage that is desirable.

This appears to generalize to P. gallinaceum and any combination of mosquito and avian.

== Virulence factors ==
Circumsporozoite protein (CSP) is required for host invasion. Warburg et al., 1992 provides a monoclonal antibody against CSP and demonstrates efficacy. The complete inhibition of sporozoite colonization of Aedes aegypti salivary glands they achieved could be due to the antibody itself blocking contact between the sporozoites and the gland surface, however the antibody's binding is inhibited by a particular CSP motif, suggesting antibody efficacy is due to its anti-CSP effect. This 15-amino acid motif is one found by the original Dame et al., 1984 discovery of CSP which contains the 5-length CSP Region I.

== Pathology ==
Infection produces severe changes in blood plasma composition. Williams 2005 finds large changes in plasma proteins at 8 days post infection. There is a reduction in albumin, α2-globulin, and creatinine. Meanwhile, there is an increase in γ1-globulin, γ2-globulin, total plasma protein, and total plasma enzyme. (The enzyme increase is due to an increase in aspartate aminotransferase, glutamate dehydrogenase, and γ-glutamyltransferase.)
