= Avian malaria =

Parasitic disease of birds

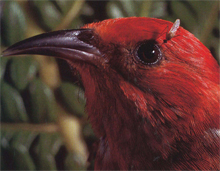
A mosquitoes bites the eye of an 'Apapane bird in Hawaii.

Avian malaria is a parasitic disease of birds, caused by parasite species belonging to the genera Plasmodium and Hemoproteus (phylum Apicomplexa, class Haemosporidia, family Plasmoiidae). The disease is transmitted by a dipteran vector including mosquitoes in the case of Plasmodium parasites and biting midges for Hemoproteus. The range of symptoms and effects of the parasite on its bird hosts is very wide, from asymptomatic cases to drastic population declines due to the disease, as is the case of the Hawaiian honeycreepers. The diversity of parasites is large, as it is estimated that there are approximately as many parasites as there are species of hosts. Co-speciation and host switching events have contributed to the broad range of hosts that these parasites can infect, causing avian malaria to be a widespread global disease, found everywhere except Antarctica.

== Cause ==
Avian malaria is most notably caused by Plasmodium relictum, a protist that infects birds in all parts of the world apart from Antarctica. Captive penguins in non-native environments are exposed to the protozoa without having coevolved with them and are especially sensitive to infection. The most common presentation of the disease in affected penguins is acute death. Infection of wild penguins is reported and a greater understanding of the significance of such infections is required. There are several other species of Plasmodium that infect birds, such as Plasmodium anasum and Plasmodium gallinaceum, but these are of less importance except, in occasional cases, for the poultry industry. The disease is found worldwide, with important exceptions. Usually, it does not kill birds. However, in areas where avian malaria is newly introduced, such as the islands of Hawaiʻi, it can be devastating to birds that have lost evolutionary resistance over time, like the Mohoidae family.

== Parasite species ==
Avian malaria is a vector-transmitted disease caused by protozoa in the genera Plasmodium and Haemoproteus; these parasites reproduce asexually within bird hosts and both asexually and sexually within their insect vectors, which include mosquitoes (Culicidae), biting midges (Ceratopogonidae), and louse flies (Hippoboscidae). The blood-parasites of the genus Plasmodium and Haemoproteus, encompass an extremely diverse group of pathogens with global distribution. The large number of parasite lineages along with their wide range of potential host species and the pathogen's capacity for host switching makes the study of this system extremely complex. Evolutionary relationships between hosts and the parasites have only added complexity and suggested extensive sampling is needed to elucidate how global cospeciation events drive disease transmission and maintenance in various ecosystems. In addition to this, the parasite's ability to disperse can be mediated by migratory birds and thus increases variation in prevalence patterns and alters host-parasite adaptation processes. Host susceptibility is highly variable as well and numerous efforts have been made to understand the relationship between increased prevalence and host traits such as nesting and foraging height, sexual dimorphism or even incubation time length. So far, the effects of this disease in wild populations is poorly understood. A 2015 study using blood samples from Malawian bird fauna found that close to 80% of were infected with either malaria or closely related alveolates. Closed-cup nesters, such as weavers and Cisticola, were more likely to be infected with Plasmodium than with midge-borne parasites such as Haemoproteus and Leucocytozoon. In a study they have found that juvenile birds have a higher rate of deaths as well as infections when compared to adults. This indicated that the age where birds can develop can show how severe the infections are. The significance of this is that avian malaria does not only affect adult birds but also spreads in juvenile birds. This further affects them from the opportunity to reproduce and reduces the populations for the next year which in turn accelerates the declines of these birds in the future.

There exists much controversy on what corresponds as a species in avian malaria parasites. The Latin binomials nomenclature used to describe Plasmodium and Hemoproteus parasites is based on a restricted set of morphological characteristics and the restriction to which parasites of birds they are able to infect. Therefore, considering co-speciation events or even species diversity for malaria parasites is surrounded by much disagreement. Molecular tools have directed classification towards a phylogenetic definition of lineages, based on sequence divergence and the range of hosts in which the parasite can be found. The diversity of avian malaria parasites and other haemosporidia is extremely large, and previous studies have found that the number of parasites approximates the number of hosts, with significant host switching events and parasite sharing. The current approach suggests amplification of the cytochrome b gene of the parasite and the reconstruction of genealogies based on this information. Due to the large number of lineages and different host species, a public database called MalAvi has been created to encourage sharing these sequences and aid in understanding the diversity of these parasites. Considering that no other genetic markers have been developed for this group of parasites, a ~1.2–4% sequence divergence has been determined as a cutoff value to distinguish between different parasite lineages. The molecular approach has also allowed direct comparisons between host phylogenies and parasite genealogies, and significant co-speciation has been found based on event-based-matching of phylogenetic trees.

=== Phylogeny of malaria parasites ===
There is no specific phylogeny for avian malaria parasites and related haemosporidian parasites. However, given that malaria parasites can be found in reptiles, birds and mammals, it is possible to combine the data from these groups and a well resolved large phylogeny is available. For over a century, parasitologists classified malaria parasites based on morphological and life-history traits and new molecular data shows that these have variable phylogenetic signals. The current approach suggests that Plasmodium species infecting birds and squamate reptiles belong to one clade, and mammalian lineages belonging to a separate clade. In the case of Haemoproteus, this group has traditionally been classified based on the vector host, with one clade being transmitted to columbiform birds by hippoboscid flies and a second group transmitted by biting midges to other avian families. The molecular data supports this approach and suggests reclassifying the later group as Parahaemoproteous.

=== Phylogeography of avian malaria ===
Although a widespread disease, the culprit most commonly associated with the disease is Plasmodium relictum and associated lineages. To better understand the parasite's epidemiology and geographical distribution, analysis of genetic variation across large geographical scales have been conducted by looking at the nuclear gene MSP1 (merozoite surface protein) from Plasmodium relictum . Findings have revealed that there are significant differences between lineages from the New and Old World, suggesting different introductions of the parasite to avian populations. In addition to this, considerable variation was found between Europe and African lineages, suggesting different patterns of transmission for temperate and tropical populations. Although this approach is relatively recent, detecting allelic variation in different markers is essential to unveil parasite transmission patterns and the likelihood of introduction to new susceptible host populations.

== Vector ==
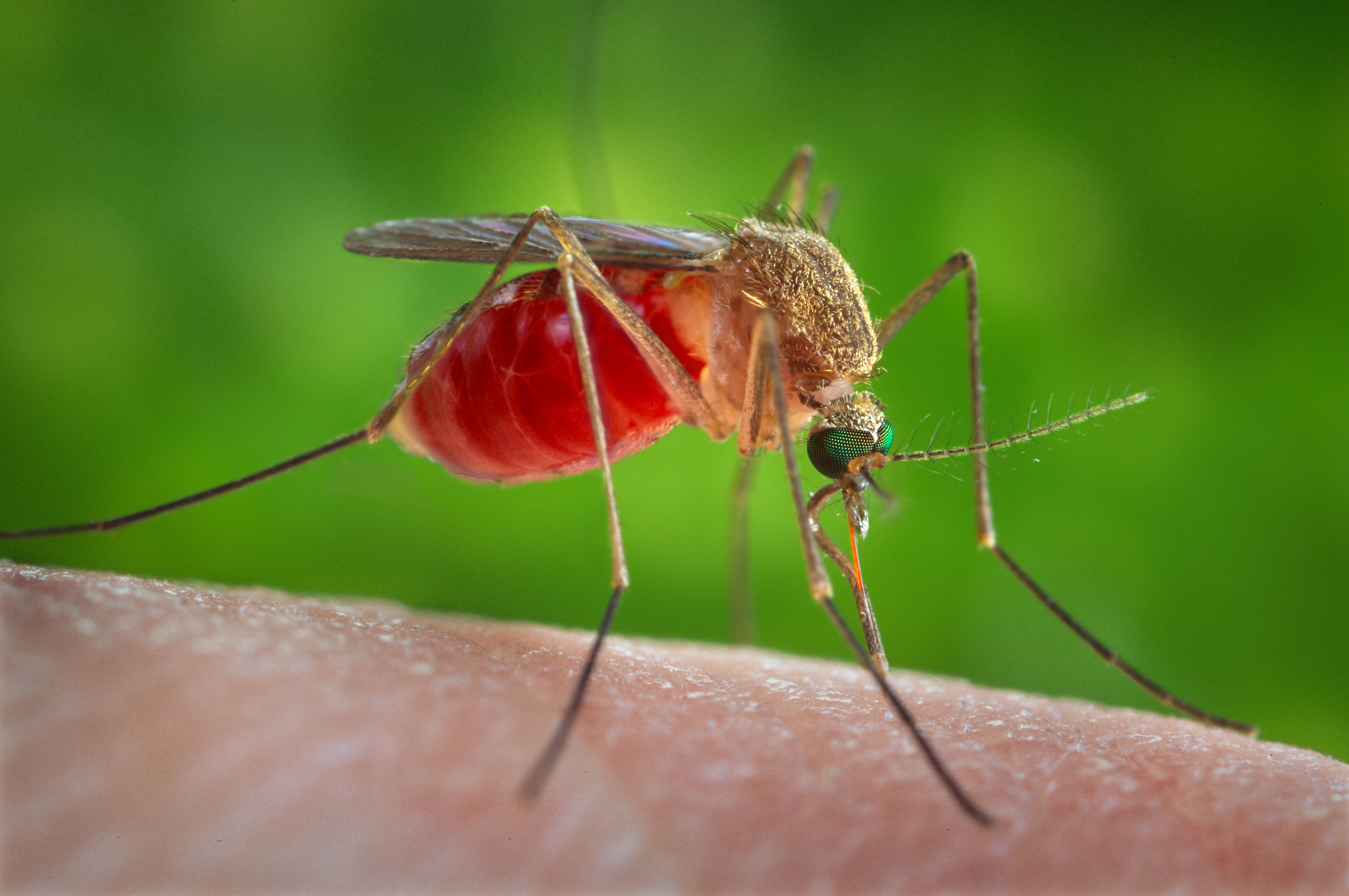
Culex quinquefasciatus mosquito

Contrary to the state of knowledge on parasite-avian interactions, parasite-vector relationships are relatively less explored. MalAvi does list several known vectors however as of 2015 this is not at all complete. Generally avian malaria organisms are vectored by Culex.

Its vector in Hawaiʻi is the mosquito Culex quinquefasciatus, which was introduced to the Hawaiian Islands in 1826. Since then, avian malaria and avipoxvirus together have devastated the native bird population, resulting in many extinctions. Hawaiʻi has more extinct birds than anywhere else in the world; just since the 1980s, ten unique birds have disappeared.

Virtually every individual of susceptible endemic species below 4,000 feet (1,200 m) in elevation has been eliminated by the disease. These mosquitoes are limited to lower elevations, below 5,000 feet (1,500 m), by cold temperatures that prevent larval development. However, they appear to be slowly gaining a foothold at higher elevations and their range may be expanding upwards. If so, most remaining Hawaiian land birds may become at risk to extinction.

Most of the Hawaiian Islands have a maximum elevation of less than 5,000 feet (1,500 m), so with the exception of the island of Hawaiʻi and East Maui, native birds may become extinct on every other island if the mosquito is able to occupy higher elevations.

== Research on avian malaria ==
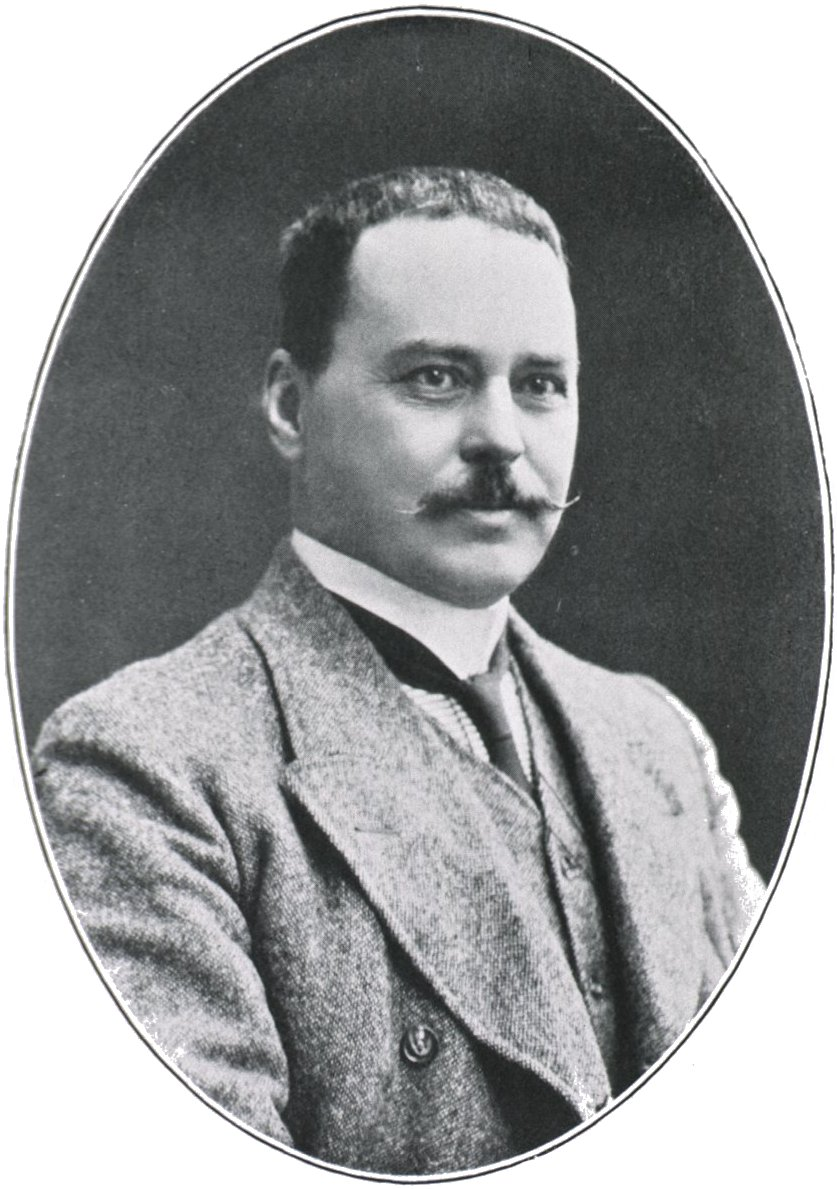
Ronald Ross

Ronald Ross was born in Almora, India in 1857. Although he had no predisposition to medicine, at the age of 17 he submitted to his father's wish to see him enter the Indian Medical Service. He began his medical studies at St. Bartholomew's Hospital Medical College, London in 1874 and sat the examinations for the Royal College of Surgeons of England in 1879. He took the post of ship surgeon on a transatlantic steamship while studying for, and gaining the Licentiate of the Society of Apothecaries, which allowed him to enter the Indian Medical Service in 1881, where he held temporary appointments in Madras, Burma, and the Andaman Islands. In 1892 he became interested in malaria and, having originally doubted the parasites' existence, became an enthusiastic convert to the belief that malaria parasites were in the blood stream when this was demonstrated to him by Patrick Manson during a period of home leave in 1894.

In 1895, Ross embarked on a quest to prove the hypothesis of Alphonse Laveran and Manson that mosquitoes were intricately linked to the propagation of malaria. On 20 August 1897, Ross made his landmark discovery in Secunderabad. While dissecting the stomach tissue of an anopheline mosquito that had fed on a patient with malaria four days earlier, he found the malaria parasite, thus conclusively proving the role of Anopheles mosquitoes in the transmission of malaria parasites in humans. He continued his research into malaria in India, using a more convenient experimental model—malaria in birds. In 1898, he had demonstrated that mosquitoes could serve as intermediate hosts for bird malaria. After feeding mosquitoes on infected birds, he observed that malaria parasites could develop in the mosquitoes and migrate to the insects' salivary glands, enabling the mosquitoes to infect other birds during subsequent blood meals. In 1902, Ross was awarded the Nobel Prize in Medicine for his discovery of the mosquito transmission of malaria.

== Cycle of infection ==
The infection cycle typically commences with immature parasites known as sporozoites, which are carried in the saliva of infected female mosquitoes, in various Plasmodium species. After being bitten by one of these mosquitoes, sporozoites either directly enter the bloodstream or deeply penetrate into the bird's skin, invading fibroblasts and macrophages and maturing into forms called merozoites. Within 36 to 48 hours, merozoites are released into the bloodstream and transported to macrophages in the brain, liver, spleen, kidney, and lung. Subsequently, the parasites commence asexual reproduction, generating copies of themselves. The new generations of merozoites infect red blood cells, where they grow, reproduce, and eventually cause the cells to burst open. This sudden release of parasites and the loss of red cells trigger the acute phase of infection. In susceptible birds, this phase is primarily characterized by anemia, accompanied by symptoms of weakness, depression, and loss of appetite. Some birds may even become comatose and die.

== Disease process and epidemiology ==
Plasmodium relictum reproduces in red blood cells. If the parasite load is sufficiently high, the bird begins losing red blood cells, causing anemia. Because red blood cells are critical for moving oxygen about the body, loss of these cells can lead to progressive weakness and, eventually, death. Malaria mainly affects passerines (perching birds). In Hawaiʻi, this includes most of the native Hawaiian honeycreepers and the Hawaiian crow. Susceptibility to the disease varies between species, for example, the ʻiʻiwi is very susceptible to malaria while the ʻApapane less so. Native Hawaiʻian birds are more susceptible than introduced birds to the disease and exhibit a higher mortality rate. This has serious implications for native bird faunas with P. relictum being blamed for the range restriction and extinctions of a number of bird species in Hawaiʻi, primarily forest birds of low-land forests habitats where the mosquito vector is most common.

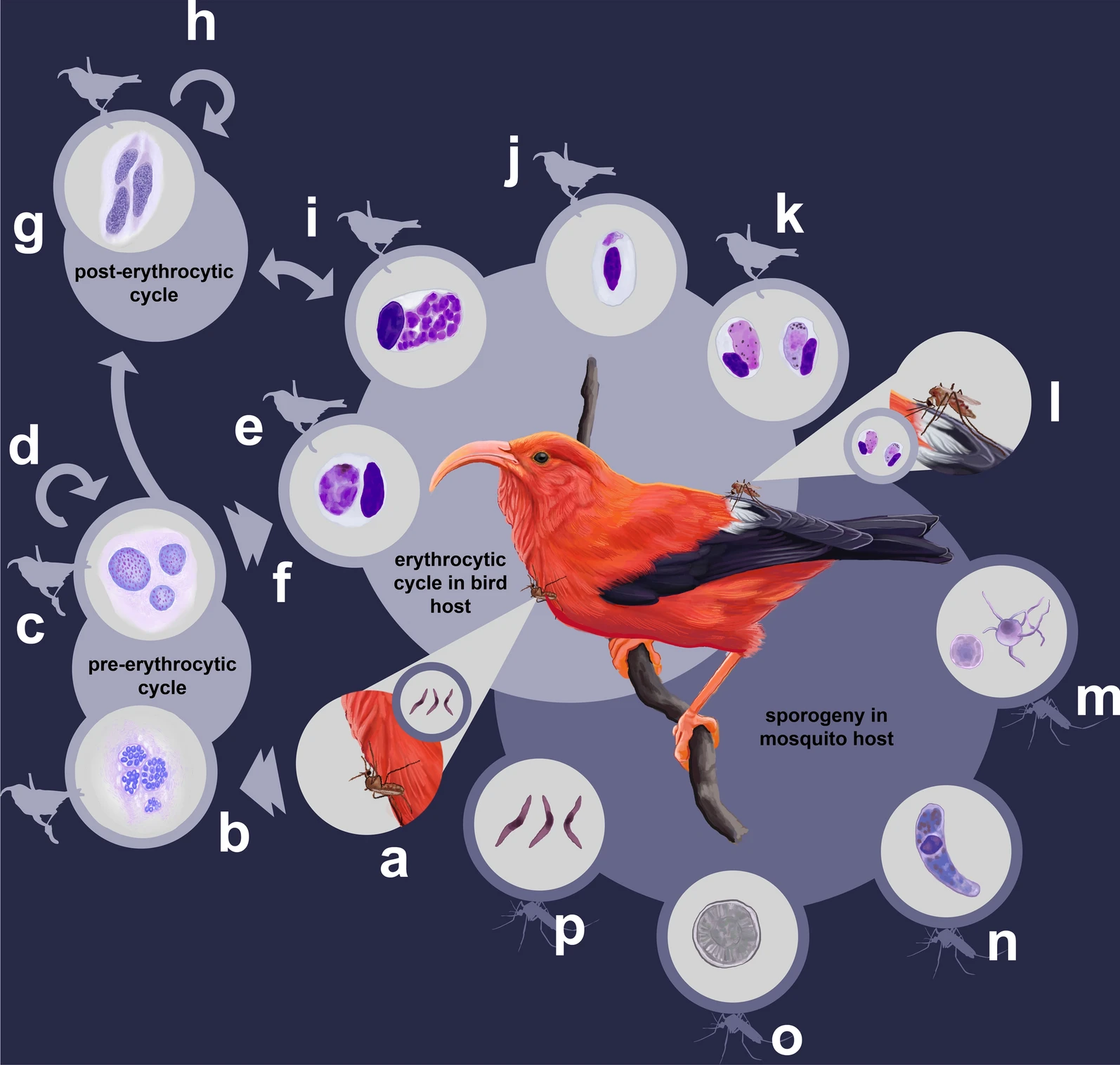
Avian malaria life cycle.

It is predicted that climate warming will also lead to changes in disease distribution at certain altitudes. At high elevation in the Hawaiian Islands, for example, it is expected that climate warming will allow for year-round transmission of avian malaria. This increased opportunity for transmission will likely be devastating to endangered native Hawaiian birds that have little or no resistance to the disease.

As malaria is spreading to higher altitude breeding grounds, it also threatens reproductive success and also lowers the chick's survival. This further disrupts the growth of the entire population of birds.Climate modeling studies have shows that without intervention, the transmission zones would continue to grow upwards which shrinks the already limiting high-elevation sanctuaries that many native species depend on for survival.If this happens this leads for the majority of the remaining Hawaiian land birds to become a risk to extinctionThis is devastating for critically endangered birds like the ʻiʻiwi and they would have nowhere left to go at lower elevations, and 90% of them die once they catch the disease.

Additionally, recent studies in California urban areas have shown that Plasmodium infections in birds like the Dark-eyed Junco are more influenced by rainfall than by urbanization itself, while infections by the more specialist Haemoproteus parasites significantly decrease in highly urbanized environments.

The incidence of this disease has nearly tripled in the last 70 years. Notable among the species of birds most heavily affected are house sparrows, great tits, and Eurasian blackcaps. Prior to 1990, when global temperatures were cooler than now, less than 10 percent of house sparrows (Passer domesticus) were infected with malaria. In recent years, however, this figure has increased to nearly 30%. Likewise, since 1995, the percent of malaria-infected great tits has risen from 3% to 15%. In 1999, some 4% of blackcaps—a species once unaffected by avian malaria—were infected. For tawny owls in the UK, the incidence had risen from 2–3% to 60%. Samples collected from wild birds in a tropical dry forest in Guatemala in 2021 revealed a 38% prevalence of avian malaria.

Although new epidemics are expected to be driven by speciation events, the real situation is still poorly understood. Host switching is more common in avian haemosporidians, including avian malaria organisms. Adaptation to whatever host populations are locally available seems to be of secondary importance.

== Control ==
The main way to control avian malaria is to control mosquito populations. Hunting and removing pigs helps, because wallows from feral pigs and hollowed out logs of the native hapu'u ferns provide dirty standing water where the mosquito breeds (USDI and USGS 2005). Around houses, reducing the number of potential water catchment containers helps reduce the mosquito breeding sites (SPREP Undated). However, in Hawaiʻi, attempts to control the mosquitoes by larval habitat reduction and larvicide use have not eliminated the threat.

It may also be possible to find birds that are resistant to malaria, collect eggs and raise young birds for re-introduction into areas where birds are not resistant, giving the species a head-start on spreading resistance. There is evidence for evolution of resistance to avian malaria in two endemic species, Oʻahu ʻamakihi and Hawaiʻi ʻamakihi. If other species can be preserved for long enough, they may evolve resistance as well. One tactic would be to reforest high-elevation areas on the island of Hawaiʻi, for example above the refuge of Hakalau on land managed by the Department of Hawaiian Homelands. This could give birds more time to adapt before climate change or mosquito evolution bring avian malaria to the last remaining bird populations.

Extirpating mosquitos from Hawaiʻi using CRISPR editing has also been suggested.
