= List of notifiable diseases =

The following is a list of notifiable diseases arranged by country.

== Bacteria ==
Australia	Hong Kong	India	Malaysia	United Kingdom	United States
					Anaplasmosis
Anthrax	Anthrax			Anthrax	Anthrax
Botulism	Botulism			Botulism	Botulism
Brucellosis				Brucellosis	Brucellosis
Campylobacteriosis					Campylobacteriosis
					Chancroid
Chlamydial infection (excluding eye infections)					Chlamydia trachomatis
Cholera	Cholera	Cholera	Cholera	Cholera	Cholera
Diphtheria	Diphtheria	Diphtheria	Diphtheria	Diphtheria	Diphtheria
Donovanosis					
					Ehrlichiosis
Shiga toxin- and verocytotoxin-producing Escherichia coli (STEC/VTEC)	Shiga toxin-producing Escherichia coli infection	Cholera-like diarrhea			Escherichia coli O157:H7 or Shiga-toxin producing Escherichia coli
		Encephalitis	Encephalitis	Encephalitis	
Gonococcal infection			Gonococcal infection/Gonorrhea		Gonorrhea
Haemolytic uraemic syndrome (HUS)				Haemolytic uraemic syndrome (HUS)	Hemolytic uremic syndrome, post-diarrheal
Haemophilus influenzae serotype b (invasive only)	Haemophilus influenzae type b infection (invasive)				Haemophilus influenzae, invasive disease
Legionellosis	Legionnaires' disease			Legionnaires' disease	Legionellosis
Leprosy	Leprosy	Leprosy	Leprosy	Leprosy	Hansen's disease (Leprosy)
Leptospirosis	Leptospirosis				
Listeriosis	Listeriosis				Listeriosis
					Lyme disease
Meningococcal disease	Meningococcal infection (invasive)	Meningitis : pyogenic and non-pyogenic		Meningococcal septicaemia/ Acute Meningitis	Meningococcal disease
	MRSA: Community-associated methicillin-resistant Staphylococcus aureus infection				
Paratyphoid fever	Paratyphoid fever		Paratyphoid fever	Paratyphoid fever	
Pertussis (Whooping cough)	Pertussis (Whooping cough)	Pertussis (Whooping cough)	Pertussis (Whooping cough)	Pertussis (Whooping cough)	
Plague	Plague (bubonic, septicemic, pneumonic and pharyngeal)	Plague	Plague	Plague	Plague (bubonic, septicemic, pneumonic and pharyngeal)
Ornithosis (Psittacosis)	Psittacosis				Psittacosis
Q fever	Q fever				Q fever, acute and chronic
	Relapsing fever		Relapsing fever		
			Rickettsiosis		Rickettsiosis, spotted fever
	Scarlet fever	Scarlet fever		Scarlet fever	
Salmonellosis					Salmonellosis
Shigellosis	Bacillary dysentery	Bacillary dysentery			Shigellosis
Group A Streptococcal disease - invasive (iGAS)				Group A Streptococcal disease	Group A Streptococcal disease
Pneumococcal disease	Pneumococcal disease, invasive				Streptococcus pneumoniae, invasive disease
	Streptococcus suis infection				
Syphilis, including congenital and non-congenital			Syphilis		Syphilis
Tetanus	Tetanus	Tetanus	Tetanus	Tetanus	Tetanus
					Toxic shock syndrome (Streptococcal and other than Streptococcal)
Tuberculosis	Tuberculosis	Tuberculosis	Tuberculosis	Tuberculosis	Tuberculosis, Mycobacterium tuberculosis
Tularaemia					Tularemia
Typhoid fever	Typhoid fever	Typhoid fever	Typhoid fever	Typhoid fever	Typhoid fever
	Typhus and other rickettsial diseases		Typhus	Typhus	
					Vancomycin-intermediate Staph. aureus (VISA), Vancomycin-resistant Staph. aureus (VRSA)

== Virus ==
Australia	Hong Kong	India	Malaysia	United Kingdom	United States
	Acquired Immunodeficiency Syndrome (AIDS)	Acquired immunodeficiency syndrome			
Regional arbovirus infections: Barmah Forest, Murray Valley encephalitis virus infection, Ross River virus infection	Dengue fever, Japanese encephalitis, other hemorrhagic fevers				Regional arbovirus infections: California serogroup virus, Eastern equine encephalitis virus, Powassan virus, St. Louis encephalitis virus, Western equine encephalitis virus
Varicella voster infection- chickenpox, shingles, and unspecified	Chickenpox	Chickenpox (regional)			Chickenpox (i.e., varicella) - morbidity and deaths only
Chikungunya fever	Chikungunya fever	Chikungunya fever			
Human coronavirus with pandemic potential (COVID-19/SARS-CoV-2)	COVID-19				
Dengue fever	Dengue fever	Dengue fever	Dengue fever		Dengue fever
	Enterovirus 71 infection				
	Hantavirus infection				Hantavirus infection
Hepatitis (all)	Hepatitis (all)	Hepatitis (all)	Hepatitis (all)	Hepatitis (all)	
Hepatitis A	Hepatitis A	Hepatitis A	Hepatitis A	Hepatitis A	Hepatitis A
Hepatitis B	Hepatitis B	Hepatitis B	Hepatitis B	Hepatitis B	Hepatitis B
Hepatitis C	Hepatitis C	Hepatitis C	Hepatitis C	Hepatitis C	Hepatitis C
Hepatitis D	Hepatitis D	Hepatitis D	Hepatitis D	Hepatitis D	
Hepatitis E	Hepatitis E	Hepatitis E	Hepatitis E	Hepatitis E	
		Herpes Zoster infection			
Human immunodeficiency virus (HIV)		Human immunodeficiency virus (HIV) infection	Human immunodeficiency virus (HIV) infection		HIV infection
Influenza- avian influenza in humans; Influenza -laboratory confirmed	Novel influenza A infection	Influenza			Influenza-associated pediatric mortality and novel influenza A infection
Japanese encephalitis virus infection	Japanese encephalitis	Japanese encephalitis			
Lyssavirus infection including Australian bat lyssavirus infection and Lyssa virus not elsewhere classified)					
Measles	Measles	Measles	Measles	Measles	Measles
Middle East respiratory syndrome coronavirus (MERS-CoV)	Middle East respiratory syndrome				
Monkeypox virus infection					
Mumps	Mumps	Mumps		Mumps	Mumps
Poliovirus infection	Acute poliomyelitis	Acute flaccid paralysis (poliomyelitis)	Poliomyelitis	Poliomyelitis	Poliomyelitis, paralytic and non-paralytic
Rabies	Rabies	Rabies	Rabies	Rabies	Rabies
Respiratory syncytial virus (RSV) infection infection					
Rotavirus infection					
Rubella (non-congenital) and congenital rubella syndrome	Rubella and congenital rubella syndrome			Rubella	Rubella
Severe Acute Respiratory Syndrome	Severe Acute Respiratory Syndrome			Severe Acute Respiratory Syndrome	Severe Acute Respiratory Syndrome
Smallpox (Last cases in 1977)	Smallpox (eradicated by the WHO)	Smallpox (and certified by 1980)		Smallpox	Smallpox
West Nile Virus (including Kunjin virus)	West Nile Virus				West Nile Virus
Yellow fever	Yellow fever	Yellow fever	Yellow fever	Yellow fever	Yellow fever
Viral haemorrhagic fever	Viral hemorrhagic fever	Viral hemorrhagic fever	Viral haemorrhagic fever, including Lassa fever, Marburg virus, and Ebola virus	Viral hemorrhagic fever	Viral hemorrhagic fever, including Arenavirus (new world), Crimean-Congo hemorrhagic fever, Dengue hemorraghic fever, Ebola virus, Lassa virus, Marburg virus
Flavivirus infection (unspecified), including Zika virus	Zika virus infection				

== Other categories ==
Disease	Australia	Hong Kong	India	Malaysia	United Kingdom	United States
Amoebic dysentery		Yes	Yes			
Babesiosis						Yes
Cancer						Yes
Coccidioidomycosis						Yes
Creutzfeldt–Jakob disease (CJD)	Yes	Yes				
variant Creutzfeldt–Jakob disease (vCJD)	Yes					
Cryptosporidiosis	Yes					Yes
Cyclosporiasis						Yes
Dysentery		Yes	Yes			
Fever syndromes more than 6 days			Yes			
Giardiasis						Yes
Foodborne diseases outbreak		Yes			Yes	Yes
Lead, elevated blood levels						Yes
Malaria	Yes	Yes	Yes	Yes	Yes	Yes
Pesticide-related illness, acute						Yes
Silicosis						Yes
Trichinosis						Yes
Waterborne diseases outbreak						Yes

== See also ==
- Notifiable diseases in Switzerland
