= Epidemic polyarthritis =

Obsolete medical term

Epidemic polyarthritis is an outdated term that was formerly used to refer to polyarthritis caused by two mosquito-borne viruses endemic to Australasia:

- Barmah Forest virus, which causes Barmah Forest Fever
- Ross River virus (RRV), which causes Ross River Fever

The term was coined by P. G. Dowling in 1946 to describe an outbreak among Australian troops in North Queensland of a short, mild fever accompanied by polyarthritis, from February to April 1945.
