= Ross River fever =

Human disease

- Specialty: Infectious diseases

Ross River fever is a mosquito-borne disease caused by infection with the Ross River virus. The illness is typically characterised by flu like symptoms combined with polyarthritis and a rash. The virus is endemic to mainland Australia and Tasmania, the island of New Guinea, Fiji, Samoa, the Cook Islands, New Caledonia and several other islands in the South Pacific. The illness is Queensland's most prolific mosquito-borne disease.

== Symptoms and signs ==
Symptoms of the disease vary widely in severity, but major indicators are arthralgia, arthritis, fever, and rash. The incubation period is 7–9 days. About a third of infections are asymptomatic, particularly in children.

=== Acute illness ===
About 95% of symptomatic cases report joint pain. This is typically symmetrical and with acute onset, affecting the fingers, toes, ankles, wrists, back, knees and elbows. Fatigue occurs in 90% and fever, myalgia and headache occur in 50–60%.

A rash occurs in 50% of patients and is widespread and maculopapular. Lymphadenopathy occurs commonly; pharyngitis and rhinorrhea less frequently. Diarrhea is rare. About 50% of people report needing time off work with the acute illness. If the rash is unnoticed, these symptoms are quite easily mistaken for more common illnesses like influenza or the common cold. Recovery from the flu symptoms is expected within a month, but, because the virus currently cannot be removed once infection has occurred secondary symptoms of joint and muscle inflammation, pain and stiffness can last for many years. Less common manifestations include splenomegaly, hematuria and glomerulonephritis. Headache, neck stiffness, and photophobia may occur. There have been three case reports suggesting meningitis or encephalitis.

=== Chronic illness ===
Reports from the 1980s and 1990s suggested RRV infection was associated with arthralgia, fatigue and depression lasting for years. More recent prospective studies have reported a steady improvement in symptoms over the first few months, with 15–66% of patients having ongoing arthralgia at 3 months. Arthralgias have resolved in the majority by 5–7 months. The incidence of chronic fatigue is 12% at 6 months and 9% at 12 months, similar to Epstein–Barr virus and Q fever. The only significant predictor of the likelihood of developing chronic symptoms is the severity of the acute illness itself. No other aspects of the patient's medical or psychiatric history have been found to be predictive. However, in those with the most persisting symptoms (12 months or more), comorbid rheumatologic conditions and/or depression are frequently observed.

== Transmission ==
The virus can only be spread by mosquitoes. The main reservoir hosts are kangaroos and wallabies, although horses, possums and possibly birds and flying foxes play a role. Over 30 species have been implicated as possible vectors, but the major species for Ross River fever are Culex annulirostris in inland areas, Aedes vigilax in northern coastal regions and Ae. camptorhynchus in southern coastal regions.

== Diagnosis ==
A blood test is the only way to confirm a case of Ross River fever. Several types of blood tests may be used to examine antibody levels in the blood. Tests may either look for simply elevated antibodies (which indicate some sort of infection), or specific antibodies to the virus.

== Prevention ==
There is currently no vaccine available. The primary method of disease prevention is minimizing mosquito bites, as the disease is only transmitted by mosquitoes. Typical advice includes use of mosquito repellent and mosquito screens, wearing light coloured clothing, and minimising standing water around homes (e.g. removing Bromeliads, plant pots, garden ponds). Staying indoors during dusk/dawn hours when mosquitos are most active may also be effective. Bush camping is a common precipitant of infection so particular care is required.

== Treatment ==
Patients are usually managed with simple analgesics, anti-inflammatories, anti-pyretics and rest while the illness runs its course. Pentosan polysulfate has also shown recent promise.

== Epidemiology ==
Most notifications are from Queensland, tropical Western Australia and the Northern Territory. Geographical risk factors include areas of higher rainfall and higher maximal tides. In the tropics, Ross River fever is more prevalent during the summer/autumn "wet season", particularly January—March, when mosquito populations numbers are high. In southern parts of Australia, this time period may shift to earlier in the year during spring/summer. Areas noted of common place contraction of the virus include townships and along the River Murray areas. Backwaters and Lagoons are breeding grounds for mosquitos and local medical treating facilities report higher cases than cities away from the river around the riverina areas.

Areas near suitable mosquito breeding grounds—marshes, wetlands, waterways and farms with irrigation systems—are high risk areas for outbreaks. As such, the disease is more characteristic of rural and regional areas. Infection is most common in adults aged 25–44 years old, with males and females equally affected. Ross River fever is on the Australian Department of Health and Ageing's list of notifiable diseases.

== History ==
The first outbreak of RRF was in 1928 in the Hay and Narrandera region in New South Wales, Australia. The virus was first isolated in 1959 from a mosquito trapped along the Ross River in Townsville, Queensland. Since then, outbreaks have occurred in all Australian states, including Tasmania, and metropolitan areas. The largest outbreak occurred in 1979–1980 in the Western Pacific, and affected more than 60,000 people.

Before the identification of this infectious agent, the disease was referred to as "epidemic polyarthritis". This term was also used for a similar Australian disease caused by another mosquito-borne virus, Barmah Forest virus.

== Research ==
The study of RRF has been recently facilitated by the development of a mouse model. Mice infected with RRV develop hind-limb arthritis/arthralgia which is similar to human disease. The disease in mice is characterized by an inflammatory infiltrate including macrophages which are immunopathogenic and exacerbate disease. Furthermore, mice deficient in the C3 protein do not develop severe disease following infection. This indicates that an aberrant innate immune response is responsible for severe disease following RRV infection.
