= Aedes elchoensis =

Scientific classification
- Kingdom: Animalia
- Phylum: Arthropoda
- Class: Insecta
- Order: Diptera
- Family: Culicidae
- Genus: Aedes
- Species: A. elchoensis

Binomial name
- Aedes elchoensis Taylor, 1929

Species of mosquito

Aedes (macleaya) elchoensis is a species of mosquito in the genus Aedes. It is found in open forests in the Northern Territory of Australia.

A. elchoensis is known to bite horses and humans, and specimens were taken mainly at night from these activities.

== Larvae ==
The larvae of A. elchoensis resemble those of A. tremulus being pale, with a light brown head, siphon, and saddle.
