= CFAP157 =

Protein

Identifiers
- Aliases: CFAP157, C9orf117, cilia and flagella associated protein 157
- External IDs: MGI: 2447809; GeneCards: CFAP157

Gene location (Mouse)
Chr.	Chromosome 2 (mouse)
Band	2|2 B	Start	32,667,393 bp
Band	2|2 B	End	32,674,440 bp
RNA expression pattern
Bgee	Human / Mouse (ortholog); Top expressed in: right uterine tube; bronchial epithelial cell; left uterine tube; sperm; right lung; anterior pituitary; canal of the cervix; trachea; pancreatic ductal cell; upper lobe of left lung / Top expressed in: spermatid; seminiferous tubule; lip; spermatocyte; neural layer of retina; morula; pharynx; embryo; nasopharynx; epithelium of trachea; More reference expression data
BioGPS	n/a
Gene ontology
Molecular function	microtubule binding
Cellular component	cytosol; plasma membrane; cilium; cell projection; intracellular membrane-bounded organelle; ciliary basal body; cytoplasm; cytoskeleton
Biological process	sperm axoneme assembly; spermatogenesis; cell differentiation
Sources:Amigo / QuickGO
Orthologs
Databases	NCBI: entry
Species	Human	Mouse
Entrez	286207	227736
Ensembl	n/a	ENSMUSG00000038987
UniProt	Q5JU67	Q0VFX2
RefSeq (mRNA)	NM_001012502	NM_025619
RefSeq (protein)	NP_001012520	NP_079895
Location (UCSC)	n/a	Chr 2: 32.67 – 32.67 Mb
PubMed search
- Wikidata
View/Edit Human	View/Edit Mouse

Cilia and flagella associated protein 157 (CFAP157) also known as chromosome 9 open reading frame 117 (c9orf117) is a protein that in humans is encoded by the CFAP157 gene.

CFAP157 gene is "specifically required during spermatogenesis for flagellum morphogenesis and sperm motility and may be required to suppress the formation of supernumerary axonemes and ensure a correct ultrastructure," according to UniProt.

== Gene ==
=== Location ===
CFAP157 is located on chromosome 9, 9q34.11 in human from base pair 127,706,989 to base pair 127,716,002.

Location of CFAP157 in chromosome 9

=== Features ===
The size of the gene is 9,013 bases, and the orientation is plus strand. The gene holds 9 exons.

== mRNA ==
The most common variant of mRNAs of CFAP157 contains 1,722 base pairs.

=== Expression ===
CFAP157 is expressed in many human body tissues such as cervix, lung, testis, and uterus. People who have uterine tumor are likely to have an expression in CFAP157. This gene is expressed in both adults and fetuses.

== Protein ==
There are 520 amino acids in CFAP157 in human. The protein is glutamine extremely rich, and glycine poor. The protein is quite neutral with the isoelectric point at pH 7.4. The average mass of the protein is estimated to be 60,531.748 Da, and the absorption coefficient is estimated to be 25,440 M^{−1} cm^{−1}.

CFAP157 is primarily composed of α-helices, and there is no transmembrane helix. The protein structure making program called Phyre is used to create the predicted structure of CFAP157.

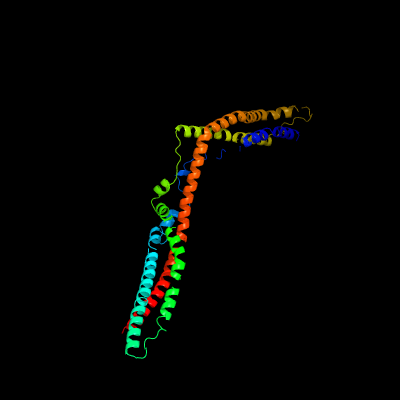
Predicted structure for CFAP157 made by Phyre

== Homology ==
There is no known paralog for CFAP157 in human. CFAP157 has numerous orthologs. The following table contains some of orthologs including human, common chimpanzee, rhesus macaque, cattle, dog, mouse, rat, tropical clawed frog, and zebra fish.

Species	Common name	Accession number	Sequence identity	Sequence similarity
Homo sapiens	Human	NP_001012520	100%	100%
Pan troglodytes	Common chimpanzee	XP_001143084	98.5%	99.0%
Macaca mulatta	Rhesus macaque	XP_001095281	95.2%	96.4%
Bos taurus	Cattle	XP_005213477	70.5%	84.0%
Canis lupus familiaris	Dog	XP_005625392	71.5%	80.9%
Mus musculus	Mouse	NP_079895	64.6%	79.0%
Rattus norvegicus	Rat	NP_001094339	64.2%	78.4%
Xenopus tropicalis	Tropical clawed frog	NP_001072774	41.5%	60.5%
Danio rerio	Zebrafish	NP_001103638	34.0%	54.9%

== Interacting Proteins ==
P14335 (Kunjin virus strain MRM61C) is the virus that interacts with CFAP157 via two-hybrid screening. Kunjin virus is not as severe as other viruses, but this is a noticeable discovery because it is possible to exploit the interaction to develop new types of medicine. Researchers at the University of Queensland discovered a new medical use for the Kunjin virus in 2005, and the possible treatments include HIV/cancer vaccines.
