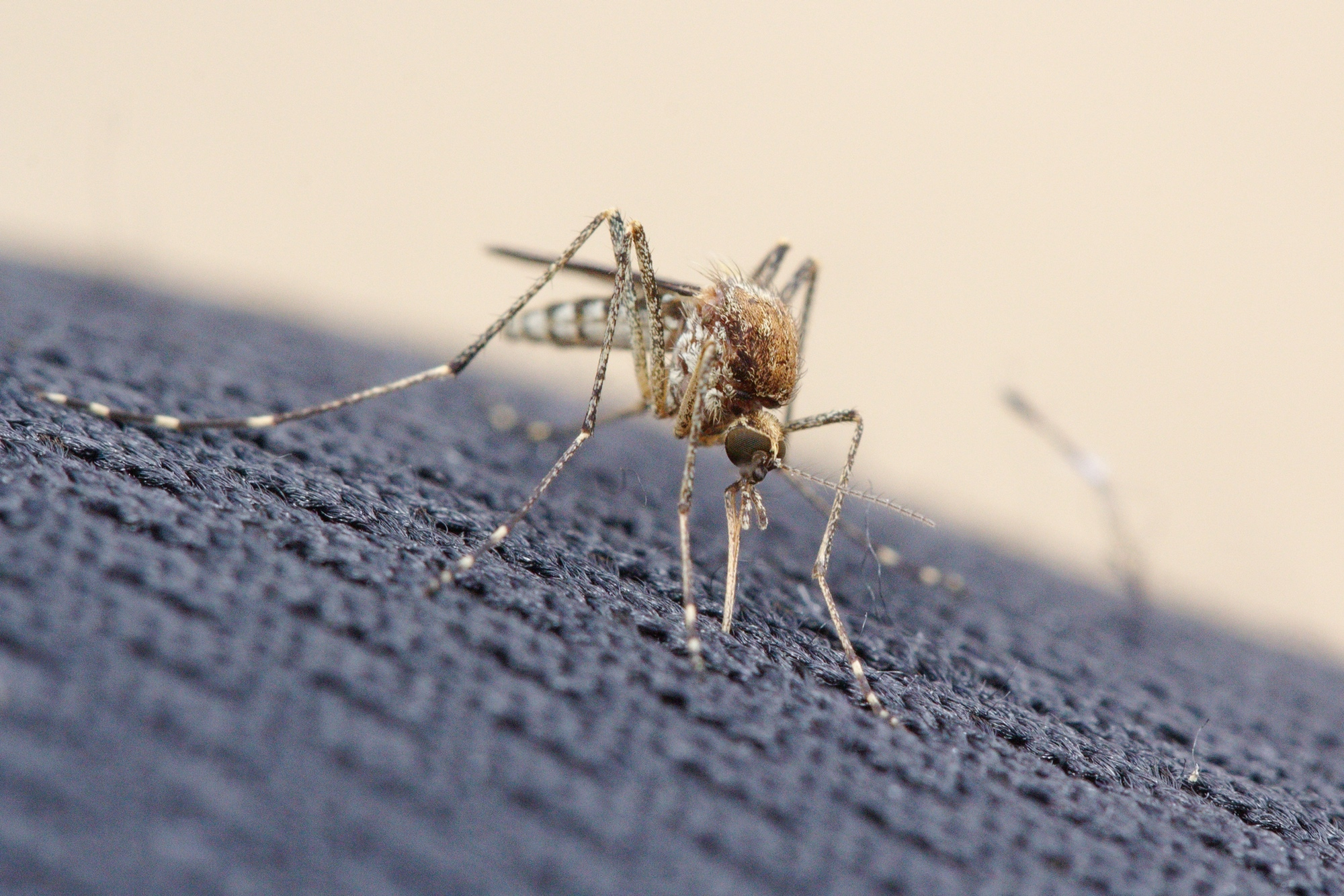

Scientific classification
- Kingdom: Animalia
- Phylum: Arthropoda
- Clade: Pancrustacea
- Class: Insecta
- Order: Diptera
- Family: Culicidae
- Genus: Aedes
- Subgenus: Ochlerotatus
- Species: A. camptorhynchus

Binomial name
- Aedes camptorhynchus (Thomson, 1869)

Synonyms
- Culex camptorhynchus Thomson, 1869; Culex labeculosus Coquillett, 1905; Culicelsa westralis Strickland, 1911; Culicada inornata Strickland, 1911; Culicada nigra Taylor, 1914; Culicada annulipes Taylor, 1914; Culicada victoriensis Taylor, 1914; Ochlerotatus camptorhynchus (Thomson, 1869)

= Aedes camptorhynchus =

Species of mosquito

Aedes camptorhynchus, the southern saltmarsh mosquito, is a species of mosquito native to southern Australia. It is responsible for transmitting the Ross River virus, which causes Ross River fever.

The mosquito had become established in New Zealand, after it was accidentally transported from Australia to Hawke's Bay, in 1998 from where it dispersed to another 10 localities mainly on the North Island. It was declared to be eradicated in 2010.

== Distribution and habitat ==
Aedes camptorhynchus occurs in New South Wales, South Australia (including Flinders Island), Tasmania (including King Island), Victoria, and Western Australia. It primarily inhabits coastal regions, but can also be found in inland areas where brackish water is present.

== Ecology ==
Aedes camptorhynchus breeds primarily in brackish swamps, but is also capable of breeding in freshwater conditions. It breeds continuously throughout the year, but is most abundant from late spring to early summer.

== Medical significance ==
Aedes camptorhynchus is a major vector of the Ross River virus in coastal areas of southern Australia, and has been demonstrated to be an effective vector of Barmah Forest virus and Murray Valley encephalitis virus in laboratory settings. It also has been found to transmit myxomatosis between infected and healthy European rabbits (Oryctolagus cuniculus) in a laboratory setting, though it may not be an effective vector in a natural setting.

== See also ==
- List of Aedes species
