= Mosquito-borne disease =

Diseases caused by bacteria, viruses or parasites transmitted by mosquitoes

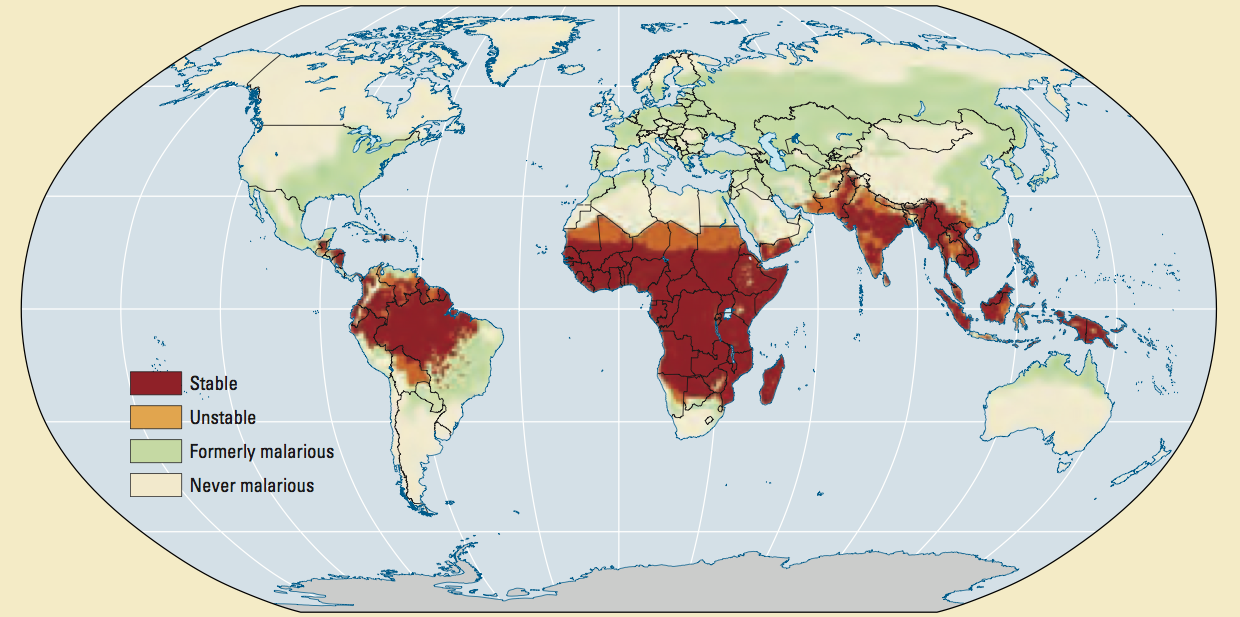
Prevalence of malaria in 2009.

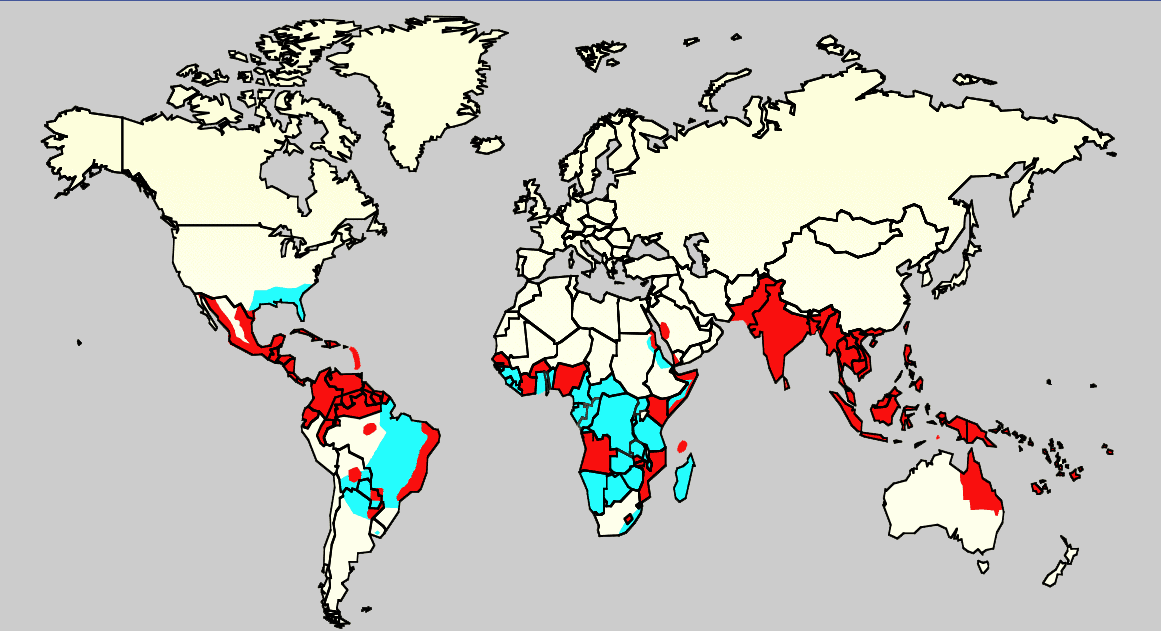
A. aegypti only and dengue distribution in 2006.

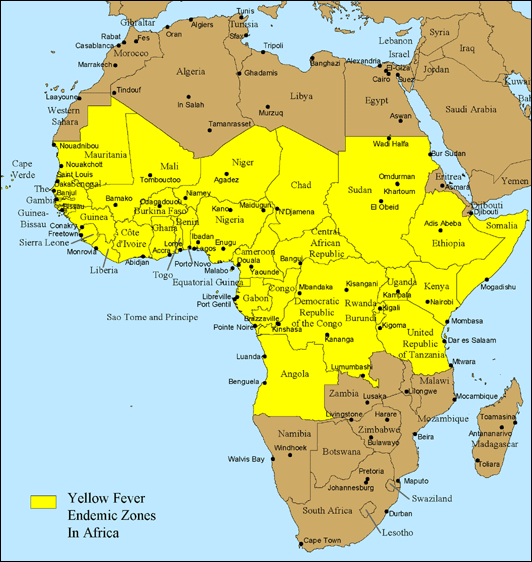
Endemic range of yellow fever in Africa (2005)

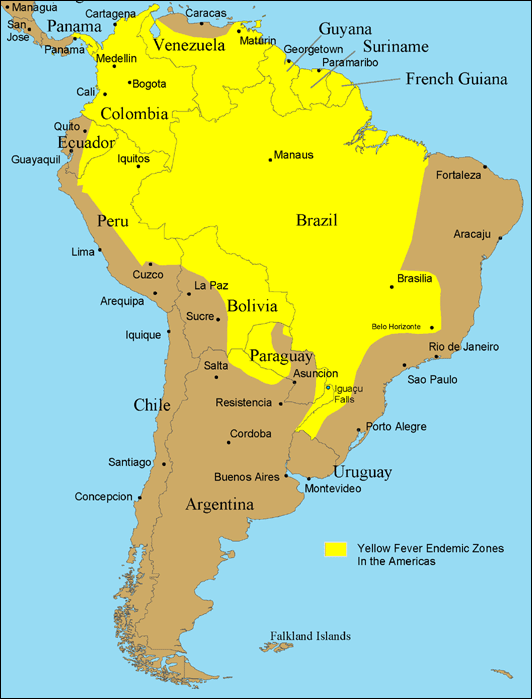
Endemic range of yellow fever in South America (2005)

Mosquito-borne diseases or mosquito-borne illnesses are diseases caused by bacteria, viruses or parasites transmitted by mosquitoes. Nearly 700 million people contract mosquito-borne illnesses each year, resulting in over a million deaths.

Diseases transmitted by mosquitoes include malaria, dengue, West Nile virus, chikungunya, yellow fever, filariasis, tularemia, dirofilariasis, Japanese encephalitis, Saint Louis encephalitis, Western equine encephalitis, Eastern equine encephalitis, Venezuelan equine encephalitis, Ross River fever, Barmah Forest fever, La Crosse encephalitis, and Zika fever, as well as newly detected Keystone virus and Rift Valley fever. A preprint by Australian research group argues that Mycobacterium ulcerans, the causative pathogen of Buruli ulcer is also transmitted by mosquitoes.

There is no evidence that COVID-19 can be transmitted by mosquitoes, and it is extremely unlikely this could occur.

== Types ==
=== Protozoa ===
The female mosquito of the genus Anopheles may carry the malaria parasite. Five different species of Plasmodium cause malaria in humans: Plasmodium falciparum, Plasmodium malariae, Plasmodium ovale, Plasmodium knowlesi and Plasmodium vivax (see Plasmodium). Worldwide, malaria is a leading cause of premature mortality, particularly in children under the age of five, with an estimated 207 million cases and more than half a million deaths in 2012, according to the World Malaria Report 2013 published by the World Health Organization (WHO). The death toll increased to one million as of 2018 according to the American Mosquito Control Association.

=== Bacterial ===
In January 2024, a publication by an Australian research group demonstrated significant genetic similarity between Mycobacterium ulcerans in humans and possums, compared to PCR screening of M. ulcerans from trapped Aedes notoscriptus mosquitoes, and concluded that Mycobacterium ulcerans, the causative pathogen of Buruli ulcer, is transmitted by mosquitos.

=== Myiasis ===
Botflies are known to parasitize humans or other mammalians, causing myiasis, and to use mosquitoes as intermediate vector agents to deposit eggs on a host. The human botfly Dermatobia hominis attaches its eggs to the underside of a mosquito, and when the mosquito takes a blood meal from a human or an animal, the body heat of the mammalian host induces hatching of the larvae.

=== Helminthiasis ===
Some species of mosquito can carry the filariasis worm, a parasite that causes a disfiguring condition (often referred to as elephantiasis) characterized by a great swelling of several parts of the body; worldwide, around 120 million people are living with a filariasis disability.

=== Virus ===
The viral diseases yellow fever, dengue fever, Zika fever and chikungunya are transmitted mostly by Aedes mosquito vectors such as Aedes aegypti and Aedes albopictus.

Other viral diseases like epidemic polyarthritis, Rift Valley fever, Ross River fever, St. Louis encephalitis, West Nile fever, Japanese encephalitis, La Crosse encephalitis and several other encephalitic diseases are carried by several different mosquitoes. Eastern equine encephalitis (EEE) and Western equine encephalitis (WEE) occur in the United States where they cause disease in humans, horses, and some bird species. Because of the high mortality rate, EEE and WEE are regarded as two of the most serious mosquito-borne diseases in the United States. Symptoms range from mild flu-like illness to encephalitis, coma, and death.

Viruses carried by arthropods such as mosquitoes or ticks are known collectively as arboviruses. The ones carried solely by mosquitoes are sometimes called moboviruses (mosquito-borne viruses). West Nile virus was accidentally introduced into the US in 1999 and by 2003 had spread to almost every state with over 3,000 cases in 2006.

Other species of Aedes as well as Culex and Culiseta are also involved in the transmission of disease.

Myxomatosis is spread by biting insects, including mosquitoes.

== Transmission ==
A mosquito's period of feeding is often undetected; the bite only becomes apparent because of the immune reaction it provokes. When a mosquito bites a human, it injects saliva and anti-coagulants. With the initial bite to an individual, there is no reaction, but with subsequent bites, the body's immune system develops antibodies. The bites become inflamed and itchy within 24 hours. This is the usual reaction in young children. With more bites, the sensitivity of the human immune system increases, and an itchy red hive appears in minutes where the immune response has broken capillary blood vessels and fluid has collected under the skin. This type of reaction is common in older children and adults. Some adults can become desensitized to mosquitoes and have little or no reaction to their bites, while others can become hyper-sensitive with bites causing blistering, bruising, and large inflammatory reactions, a response known as skeeter syndrome.

Dengue virus and Zika virus have been found to alter the skin bacteria of rats in a way that caused their body odor to be more attractive to mosquitoes.

== Signs and symptoms ==
Symptoms of illness are specific to the type of viral infection and vary in severity, based on the individuals infected.

=== Zika virus ===
Symptoms vary in severity, from mild unnoticeable symptoms to more common symptoms like fever, rash, headache, achy muscle and joints, and conjunctivitis. Symptoms can last several days to weeks, but death resulting from this infection is rare.

=== West Nile virus ===
Most people infected with the West Nile virus usually do not develop symptoms. However, some individuals can develop cases of severe fatigue, weakness, headaches, body aches, joint and muscle pain, vomiting, diarrhea, and rash, which can last for weeks or months. More serious symptoms have a greater risk of appearing in people over 60 years of age, or those with cancer, diabetes, hypertension, and kidney disease.

=== Dengue fever ===
Dengue fever is mostly characterized by high fever, headaches, joint pain, and rash. However, more severe instances can lead to hemorrhagic fever, internal bleeding, and breathing difficulty, which can be fatal.

=== Chikungunya ===
People infected with this virus can develop sudden onset fever along with debilitating joint and muscle pain, rash, headache, nausea, and fatigue. Symptoms can last a few days or be prolonged to weeks and months. Although patients can recover completely, there have been cases in which joint pain has persisted for several months and can extend beyond that for years. Other people can develop heart complications, eye problems, and even neurological complications.

=== Malaria ===
Early onset symptoms of malaria can start anywhere from 10–15 days after exposure and can present as fever, headache and chills. Symptom severity may very depend on age and previous exposures, however children under five, pregnant women and immune compromised will be at higher risk of more severe symptoms. Severe symptoms range from extreme lethargy, loss of consciousness, convulsion, difficulty breathing, bloody urine, jaundice, irregular bleeding, and death.

== Mechanism ==
Mosquitoes carrying such arboviruses are able to stay healthy due to their immune system being able to recognize the virions as foreign particles and "chop off" the virus' genetic coding, rendering it inert. A human is infected with a mosquito-borne virus when a female mosquito carrying the virus, along with its viral particles that have yet to be destroyed by the mosquito, bites a human by penetrating the skin and releasing the virus into the bloodstream. It is not completely known how mosquitoes handle eukaryotic parasites to carry them without being harmed. Data has shown that the malaria parasite Plasmodium falciparum alters the mosquito vector's feeding behavior by increasing frequency of biting in infected mosquitoes, thus increasing the chance of transmitting the parasite.

The mechanism of transmission of this disease starts with the injection of the parasite into the victim's blood when malaria-infected female Anopheles mosquitoes bite into a human being. The parasite uses human liver cells as hosts for maturation where it will continue to replicate and grow, moving into other areas of the body via the bloodstream. The spread of this infection cycle then continues when other mosquitoes bite the same individual. The result will cause that mosquito to ingest the parasite and allow it to transmit the Malaria disease into another person through the same mode of bite injection.

Flaviviridae viruses transmissible via vectors like mosquitoes include West Nile virus and yellow fever virus, which are single stranded, positive-sense RNA viruses enveloped in a protein coat. Once inside the host's body, the virus will attach itself to a cell's surface through receptor-mediated endocytosis. This essentially means that the proteins and DNA material of the virus are ingested into the host cell. The viral RNA material will undergo several changes and processes inside the host's cell so that it can release more viral RNA that can then be replicated and assembled to infect neighboring host cells. Mosquito-borne flaviviruses also encode viral antagonists to the innate immune system in order to cause persistent infection in mosquitoes and a broad spectrum of diseases in humans. The data on transmissibility via insect vectors of hepatitis C virus, also belonging to family Flaviviridae (as well as for hepatitis B virus, belonging to family Hepadnaviridae) are inconclusive. WHO states that "There is no insect vector or animal reservoir for HCV", while there are experimental data supporting at least the presence of [PCR]-detectable hepatitis C viral RNA in Culex mosquitoes for up to 13 days.

Currently, there are no specific vaccine therapies for West Nile virus approved for humans; however, vaccines are available and some show promise for animals, as a means to intervene with the mechanism of spreading such pathogens.

== Diagnosis ==
Doctors can typically identify a mosquito bite by sight.

A doctor will perform a physical examination and ask about medical history as well as any travel history. Be ready to give details on any international trips, including the dates you were traveling, the countries you visited and any contact you had with mosquitoes.

=== Dengue fever ===
Diagnosing dengue fever can be difficult, as its symptoms often overlap with many other diseases such as malaria and typhoid fever. Laboratory tests can detect evidence of the dengue viruses, however the results often come back too late to assist in directing treatment.

=== West Nile virus ===
Medical testing can confirm the presence of West Nile fever or a West Nile-related illness, such as meningitis or encephalitis. If infected, a blood test may show a rising level of antibodies to the West Nile virus. A lumbar puncture (spinal tap) is the most common way to diagnose meningitis, by analyzing the cerebrospinal fluid surrounding your brain and spinal cord. The fluid sample may show an elevated white cell count and antibodies to the West Nile virus if you were exposed. In some cases, an electroencephalography (EEG) or magnetic resonance imaging (MRI) scan can help detect brain inflammation.

=== Zika virus ===
A Zika virus infection might be suspected if symptoms are present and an individual has traveled to an area with known Zika virus transmission. Zika virus can only be confirmed by a laboratory test of body fluids, such as urine or saliva, or by blood test.

=== Chikungunya ===
Laboratory blood tests can identify evidence of chikungunya or other similar viruses such as dengue and Zika. Blood test may confirm the presence of IgM and IgG anti-chikungunya antibodies. IgM antibodies are highest 3 to 5 weeks after the beginning of symptoms and will continue be present for about 2 months.

== Prevention ==
There is a re-emergence of mosquito vectored viruses (arthropod-borne viruses) called arboviruses carried by the Aedes aegypti mosquito. Examples are the Zika virus, chikungunya virus, yellow fever and dengue fever. The re-emergence of the viruses has been at a faster rate, and over a wider geographic area, than in the past. The rapid re-emergence is due to expanding global transportation networks, the mosquito's increasing ability to adapt to urban settings, the disruption of traditional land use and the inability to control expanding mosquito populations. Like malaria, arboviruses do not have a vaccine. (The only exception is yellow fever.) Prevention is focused on reducing the adult mosquito populations, controlling mosquito larvae and protecting individuals from mosquito bites. Depending on the mosquito vector, and the affected community, a variety of prevention methods may be deployed at one time.

Mosquito borne diseases are indirectly contagious, a mosquito needs to get infected from biting a patient first than transfer it to the next thus, they both need to be in the general area. Mosquito control measures during the Panama canal construction provide the only successful case study of reducing from outbreak status s to zero-malaria and zero-yellow fever, where among applied measures the authority achieve zero yellow fever and zero malaria status where patients were aggressively treat in off-site facilities. Most of the current testing for mosquito-borne diseases is extremely costly, often requiring expensive equipment, resources, and laboratory staff. This is an increasing need for low cost, accessible, easily detectable and dispensable assays that can detect the presence of these mosquito-borne diseases. Further research into these point of care detection methods, especially in rural areas when dengue is most prevalent, would allow for increased monitoring, detection and prevention of mosquito-borne viruses.

=== Insecticidal nets and indoor residual spraying ===
The use of insecticide treated mosquito nets (ITNs) are at the forefront of preventing mosquito bites that cause malaria. The prevalence of ITNs in sub-Saharan Africa has grown from 3% of households to 50% of households from 2000 to 2010 with over 254 million insecticide treated nets distributed throughout sub-Saharan Africa for use against the mosquito vectors Anopheles gambiae and Anopheles funestus which carry malaria. Because the Anopheles gambiae feeds indoors (endophagic) and rests indoors after feeding (endophilic), insecticide treated nets (ITNs) interrupt the mosquito's feeding pattern. The ITNs continue to offer protection, even after there are holes in the nets, because of their excito-repellency properties which reduce the number of mosquitoes that enter the home. The World Health Organization (WHO) recommends treating ITNs with the pyrethroid class of insecticides. There is an emerging concern of mosquito resistance to insecticides used in ITNs. Twenty-seven (27) sub-Saharan African countries have reported Anopheles vector resistance to pyrethroid insecticides.

Indoor spraying of insecticides is another prevention method widely used to control mosquito vectors. To help control the Aedes aegypti mosquito, homes are sprayed indoors with residual insecticide applications. Indoor residual spraying (IRS) reduces the female mosquito population and mitigates the risk of dengue virus transmission. Indoor residual spraying is completed usually once or twice a year. Mosquitoes rest on walls and ceilings after feeding and are killed by the insecticide. Indoor spraying can be combined with spraying the exterior of the building to help reduce the number of mosquito larvae and subsequently, the number of adult mosquitoes.

=== Female mosquito trap ===
Only female mosquito bite on only warm blooded animals, they have capability to identify and target their hosts from 1–3 miles away in real time proportioning to 1500 miles in human distance. Even us, we only can identify miles far targets through vision, by the rays they emit, so do mosquitoes, they must be able to see our warmth, or our thermal images because warmth is an obligatory condition they are on the hunt and because electromagnetic radiation is the only media that has miles long atmospheric reach. then for the trap to target only female mosquitoes it must utilize their capacity to see thermal images to use warmth as attractant or a warm lure such as:. with distinct preferences, between side-by-side 37 °C, 40 °C and 42 °C thermal image footprints, they choose to go to the warmer first. A 42 °C trap in front of a house will have its front yard mosquito-bite-free area for humans and mammal pets but not birds for their body temperatures are also at 42 °C.

=== Personal protection methods ===
There are other methods that an individual can use to protect themselves from mosquito bites. Limiting exposure to mosquitoes from dusk to dawn when the majority of mosquitoes are active and wearing long sleeves and long pants during the period mosquitoes are most active. Placing screens on windows and doors is a simple and effective means of reducing the number of mosquitoes indoors. Anticipating mosquito contact and using a topical mosquito repellent with icaridin or DEET is also recommended. Draining or covering water receptacles, both indoor and outdoors, is also a simple but effective prevention method. Removing debris and tires, cleaning drains, and cleaning gutters help larval control and reduce the number of adult mosquitoes.

=== Vaccines ===
There is a vaccine for yellow fever which was developed in the 1930s, the yellow 17D vaccine, and it is still in use today. The initial yellow fever vaccination provides lifelong protection for most people and provides immunity within 30 days of the vaccine. Reactions to the yellow fever vaccine have included mild headache and fever, and muscle aches. There are rare cases of individuals presenting with symptoms that mirror the disease itself. The risk of complications from the vaccine are greater for individuals over 60 years of age. In addition, the vaccine is not usually administered to babies under nine months of age, pregnant women, people with allergies to egg protein, and individuals living with AIDS/HIV. The World Health Organization (WHO) reports that 105 million people have been vaccinated for yellow fever in West Africa from 2000 to 2015.

To date, there are relatively few vaccines against mosquito-borne diseases, this is due to the fact that most viruses and bacteria caused by mosquitos are highly mutatable. The National Institute of Allergy and Infectious Disease (NIAID) began Phase 1 clinical trials of a new vaccine that would be nearly universal in protecting against the majority of mosquito-borne diseases.

==== Dengvaxia ====
Dengvaxia, developed by Sanofi-Pasteur, was the first dengue vaccine available in the United States. Dengvaxia (CYD-TVD) is a live attenuated vaccine, meaning it consists of a less severe pathogen which helps provide the human immune system with protective antigens and greater long term immunity. In order to receive the vaccine a previous laboratory confirmed positive dengue infection is required. Three doses of the vaccine are required for full protection against dengue, with dose 1 being given immediately after conformation of a previous dengue infection, dose 2 given six months after receiving the first dose, and dose 3 given six months after receiving the second dose. Statistics have shown Dengvaxia to protect against dengue illness in 8 out of 10 children who contracted dengue virus prior to receiving the vaccine.

However, recently the manufacturers of Dengvaxia, Sanofi-Pasteur has begun to stop manufacturing the vaccine, citing a lack of demand.

==== TAK-003 ====
In May 2024, TAK-003 became the second dengue vaccine to be prequalified by the World Health Organization (WHO). This live-attenuated vaccine, developed by Takeda is similar to the Dengvaxia vaccine in the fact that it contains a weakened version of the four variants of dengue virus. The difference between the two vaccines is the TAK-003 vaccine can be administered without a prior dengue infection and it also induces cellular immunity against dengue virus along with host immunity. This vaccine is administered in two doses, with three months in between the doses.

=== Education and community involvement ===
The arboviruses have expanded their geographic range and infected populations that had no recent community knowledge of the diseases carried by the Aedes aegypti mosquito. Education and community awareness campaigns are necessary for prevention to be effective. Communities are educated on how the disease is spread, how they can protect themselves from infection and the symptoms of infection. Community health education programs can identify and address the social/economic and cultural issues that can hinder preventative measures. Community outreach and education programs can identify which preventative measures a community is most likely to employ. Leading to a targeted prevention method that has a higher chance of success in that particular community. Community outreach and education includes engaging community health workers and local healthcare providers, local schools and community organizations to educate the public on mosquito vector control and disease prevention.

== Treatments ==
=== Yellow fever ===
Numerous drugs have been used to treat yellow fever disease with minimal satisfaction to date. Patients with multisystem organ involvement will require critical care support such as possible hemodialysis or mechanical ventilation. Rest, fluids, and acetaminophen are also known to relieve milder symptoms of fever and muscle pain. Due to hemorrhagic complications, aspirin should be avoided. Infected individuals should avoid mosquito exposure by staying indoors or using a mosquito net.

=== Dengue fever ===
Dengue infection's therapeutic management is simple, cost effective and successful in saving lives by adequately performing timely institutionalized interventions. Treatment options are restricted, while no effective antiviral drugs for this infection have been accessible to date. Patients in the early phase of the dengue virus may recover without hospitalization. However, ongoing clinical research is in the works to find specific anti-dengue drugs. Dengue fever occurs via Aedes aegypti mosquito (it acts as a vector).

=== Zika virus ===
Zika virus vaccine clinical trials are to be conducted and established. There are efforts being put toward advancing antiviral therapeutics against zika virus for swift control. Present day Zika virus treatment is symptomatic through antipyretics and analgesics. Currently there are no publications regarding viral drug screening. Nevertheless, therapeutics for this infection have been used.

=== Chikungunya ===
There are no treatment modalities for acute and chronic chikungunya that currently exist. Most treatment plans use supportive and symptomatic care like analgesics for pain and anti-inflammatories for inflammation caused by arthritis. In acute stages of this virus, rest, antipyretics and analgesics are used to subside symptoms. Most use non-steroidal anti-inflammatory drugs (NSAIDs). In some cases, joint pain may resolve from treatment but stiffness remains.

=== Latest treatment ===
The sterile insect technique (SIT) uses irradiation to sterilize insect pests before releasing them in large numbers to mate with wild females. Since they do not produce any offspring, the population, and consequently the disease incidence, is reduced over time. Used successfully for decades to combat fruit flies and livestock pests such as screwworm and tsetse flies, the technique can be adapted also for some disease-transmitting mosquito species. Pilot projects are being initiated or are under way in different parts of the world.

== Epidemiology ==
Child deaths from malaria number

Mosquito-borne diseases, such as dengue fever and malaria, typically affect developing countries and areas with tropical climates. Mosquito vectors are sensitive to climate changes and tend to follow seasonal patterns. Between years there are often dramatic shifts in incidence rates. The occurrence of this phenomenon in endemic areas makes mosquito-borne viruses difficult to treat.

Dengue fever is caused by infection through viruses of the family Flaviviridae. The illness is most commonly transmitted by Aedes aegypti mosquitoes in tropical and subtropical regions. Dengue virus has four different serotypes, each of which are antigenically related but have limited cross-immunity to reinfection.

Although dengue fever has a global incidence of 50–100 million cases, only several hundreds of thousands of these cases are life-threatening. The geographic prevalence of the disease can be examined by the spread of Aedes aegypti. Over the last twenty years, there has been a geographic spread of the disease. Dengue incidence rates have risen sharply within urban areas which have recently become endemic hot spots for the disease. The recent spread of Dengue can also be attributed to rapid population growth, increased coagulation in urban areas, and global travel. Without sufficient vector control, the dengue virus has evolved rapidly over time, posing challenges to both government and public health officials.

Malaria is caused by a protozoan called Plasmodium falciparum. P. falciparum parasites are transmitted mainly by the Anopheles gambiae complex in rural Africa. In just this area, P. falciparum infections comprise an estimated 200 million clinical cases and 1 million annual deaths. 75% of individuals affected in this region are children. As with dengue, changing environmental conditions have led to novel disease characteristics. Due to increased illness severity, treatment complications, and mortality rates, many public health officials concede that malaria patterns are rapidly transforming in Africa. Scarcity of health services, rising instances of drug resistance, and changing vector migration patterns are factors that public health officials believe contribute to malaria's dissemination.

Chikungunya is caused by an alphavirus transmitted by the same Aedes aegypti and Ae. albopictus mosquitoes responsible for dengue and Zika, following an identical daytime urban bite cycle. Chikungunya (CHIKV) rarely kills but causes debilitating polyarthritis that persists for months or years in 30–60% of patients, making its chronic disease burden substantial. A 2004–06 mutation in the E1 envelope glycoprotein enabled efficient replication in Aedes albopictus — a cooler-climate-tolerant species — dramatically expanding its geographic range and triggering the 2005–06 Indian Ocean epidemic of over one million cases.

Climate heavily affects mosquito vectors of malaria and dengue. Climate patterns influence the lifespan of mosquitos as well as the rate and frequency of reproduction. Climate change impacts have been of great interest to those studying these diseases and their vectors. Additionally, climate impacts mosquito blood feeding patterns as well as extrinsic incubation periods. Climate consistency gives researchers an ability to accurately predict annual cycling of the disease but recent climate unpredictability has eroded researchers' ability to track the disease with such precision.

== Advances in biological control of arboviruses ==
In many insect species, such as Drosophila melanogaster, researchers found that a natural infection with the bacteria strain Wolbachia pipientis increases the fitness of the host by increasing resistance to RNA viral infections. Robert L. Glaser and Mark A. Meola investigated Wolbachia-induced resistance to West Nile virus (WNV) in Drosophila melanogaster (fruit flies). Two groups of fruit flies were naturally infected with Wolbachia. Glaser and Meola then cured one group of fruit flies of Wolbachia using tetracycline. Both the infected group and the cured groups were then infected with WNV. Flies infected with Wolbachia were found to have a changed phenotype that caused resistance to WNV. The phenotype was found to be caused by a "dominant, maternally transmitted, cytoplasmic factor". The WNV-resistance phenotype was then reversed by curing the fruit flies of Wolbachia. Since Wolbachia is also maternally transmitted, it was found that the WNV-resistant phenotype is directly related to the Wolbachia infection. West Nile virus is transmitted to humans and animals through the Southern house mosquito, Culex quinquefasciatus. Glaser and Meola knew vector compatibility could be reduced through Wolbachia infection due to studies done with other species of mosquitoes, mainly, Aedes aegypti. Their goal was to transfer WNV resistance to Cx. quinquefasciatus by inoculating the embryos of the mosquito with the same strain of Wolbachia that naturally occurred in the fruit flies. Upon infection, Cx. quinquefasciatus showed an increased resistance to WNV that was transferable to offspring. The ability to genetically modify mosquitoes in the lab and then have the infected mosquitoes transmit it to their offspring showed that it was possible to transmit the bacteria to wild populations to decrease human infections.

In 2011, Ary Hoffmann and associates produced the first case of Wolbachia-induced arbovirus resistance in wild populations of Aedes aegypti through a small project called Eliminate Dengue: Our Challenge. This was made possible by an engineered strain of Wolbachia termed wMel that came from D. melanogaster. The transfer of wMel from D. melanogaster into field-caged populations of the mosquito Aedes aegypti induced resistance to dengue, yellow fever, and chikungunya viruses. Although other strains of Wolbachia also reduced susceptibility to dengue infection, they also put a greater demand on the fitness of Ae. aegypti. wMel was different in that it was thought to only cost the organism a small portion of its fitness. wMel-infected Ae. aegypti were released into two residential areas in the city of Cairns, Australia over a 14-week period. Hoffmann and associates, released a total of 141,600 infected adult mosquitoes in Yorkeys Knob suburb and 157,300 in Gordonvale suburb. After release, the populations were monitored for three years to record the spread of wMel. Population monitoring was gauged by measuring larvae laid in traps. At the beginning of the monitoring period but still within the release period, it was found that wMel-infected Ae. aegypti had doubled in Yorkeys Knob and increased 1.5-fold in Gordonvale. Uninfected Ae. aegypti populations were in decline. By the end of the three years, wMel-infected Ae. aegypti had stable populations of about 90%. However, these populations were isolated to the Yorkeys Knob and Gordonvale suburbs due to unsuitable habitat surrounding the neighborhoods.

Although populations flourished in these areas with nearly 100% transmission, no signs of spread were noted, proving disappointing for some. Following this experiment, Tom L. Schmidt and his colleagues conducted an experiment releasing Wolbachia-infected Aedes aegypti using different site selection methods occurred in different areas of Cairns during 2013. The release sites were monitored over two years. This time the release was done in urban areas that were adjacent to adequate habitat to encourage mosquito dispersal. Over the two years, the population doubled, and spatial spread was also increased, unlike the first release, giving ample satisfactory results. By increasing the spread of the Wolbachia-infected mosquitoes, the researchers were able to establish that population of a large city was possible if the mosquitoes were given adequate habitat to spread into upon release in different local locations throughout the city. In both of these studies, no adverse effects on public health or the natural ecosystem occurred. This made it an extremely attractive alternative to traditional insecticide methods given the increased pesticide resistance occurring from heavy use.

From the success seen in Australia, the researchers were able to begin operating in more threatened portions of the world. The Eliminate Dengue program spread to 10 countries throughout Asia, Latin America, and the Western Pacific blooming into the non-profit organization, World Mosquito Program, as of September 2017. They still use the same technique of infecting wild populations of Ae. aegypti as they did in Australia, but their target diseases now include Zika, chikungunya and yellow fever as well as dengue. Although not alone in their efforts to use Wolbachia-infected mosquitoes to reduce mosquito-borne disease, the World Mosquito Program method is praised for being self-sustaining in that it causes permanent phenotype change rather than reducing mosquito populations through cytoplasmic incompatibility through male-only dispersal.

Researchers working with dengue virus have also tried to introduce anti-dengue genes into the mosquito population through a Gene drive mechanism. The result would be any female mosquitos not inheriting the anti-dengue gene would die. However, this mechanism has only been shown in Drosophila melanogaster and has not yet been successful in Aedes aegypti. One possible answer to this could be utilizing the new CRISPR/Cas9 gene editing system which could potentially introduce anti-dengue genes into the offspring genome.

== See also ==
- Climate change and infectious diseases
- Disease vector
- Economic entomology
- Mosquito control
