= Aedes tremulus =

Scientific classification
- Kingdom: Animalia
- Phylum: Arthropoda
- Class: Insecta
- Order: Diptera
- Family: Culicidae
- Genus: Aedes
- Species: A. tremulus

Binomial name
- Aedes tremulus (Theobald, 1903)

Species of mosquito

Aedes (Macleaya) tremulus is a species of mosquito in the genus Aedes. It breeds in tree holes, but also artificial places such as dams, gutters, wells, tires and discarded containers. They are known to bite humans as well as other mammals and birds, particularly at dawn. Found throughout Western Australia, as well as in the Northern Territory, southern Queensland and South Australia.

This species has had Kunijn virus isolated from it and is considered a possible vector of myxomatosis in South Australia.

== Description ==
The head of A. tremulus is dark above and pale on the sides, with two prominent dark patches. The thorax is deep brown with dull golden lines, and the abdomen and legs are both black with white bands. Females are about 4.5 mm in length.
