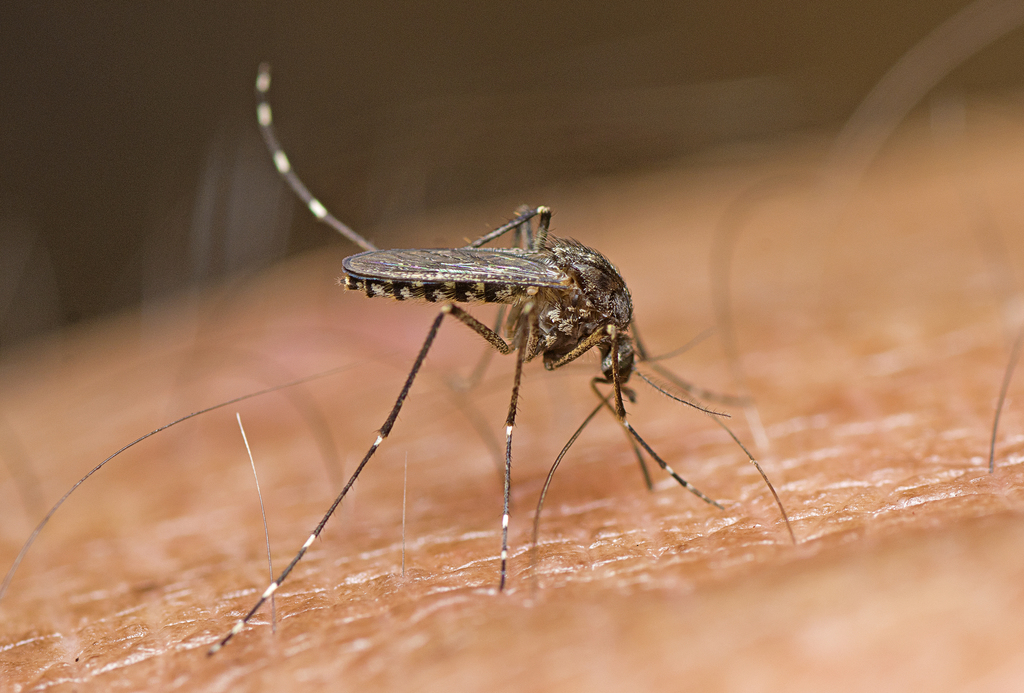

Scientific classification
- Domain: Eukaryota
- Kingdom: Animalia
- Phylum: Arthropoda
- Class: Insecta
- Order: Diptera
- Family: Culicidae
- Genus: Aedes
- Subgenus: Ochlerotatus
- Species: A. vigilax

Binomial name
- Aedes vigilax (Skuse, 1889)

Synonyms
- Culex marinus Theobald, 1901; Culex vigilax Skuse, 1889; Culicelsa uniformis Strickland, 1911; Culicelsa pseudovigilax Theobald, 1907; Ochlerotatus vigilax (Skuse, 1889)

= Aedes vigilax =

Species of mosquito

Aedes vigilax (Skuse) (Diptera: Culicidae), commonly known as the northern salt marsh mosquito, is a species of mosquito in the Indomalayan region and Australasian region. They are a major vector of arboviruses like Barmah Forest and Ross River. A. vigilax can be identified by its salt and pepper colouration, which is sharply contrasted by the broad white stripes along its abdomen and tarsi. The eggs of A. vigilax can remain drought resistant for up to 12 months and hatching can occur when eggs are saturated by subsequent tides or rain. A. vigilax is represented by a panmictic population.

== Distribution ==
A. vigilax's geographic distribution is Australia, Fiji, Indonesia (including Java, Flores, Kalimantan, Sulawesi, Sumatra including the Ketulauan Riouw Archipelago, Timor), Malaysia, New Caledonia, Papua New Guinea, New Hebrides, Philippines, Seychelles, Solomon Islands, Taiwan, Thailand, Timor, Tonga, Vanuatu and Vietnam. They are mostly common in saltmarsh and mangrove intertidal wetlands in Australia. A. vigilax uses different mechanisms of mosquito dispersal, which include appetential flight or migration and non-appetential flight (passive dispersal) from the breeding sites. Individual A. vigilax adults can fly over 3 kilometres (1.9 mi) as they disperse across an area.

=== Climate and oviposition sites ===
A. vigilax population is abundant in the hotter summer months. A. vigilax prefers lower tidal areas and higher salinity levels for its oviposition sites. They also prefer samphire dominant vegetation habitats. They exploit overbank pools such as the floodplain or extra-channel pools amongst mangroves and samphires. They also oviposit mainly in or on damp soil underneath Sarcocornia and Sporobolus. The eggs are preferably laid immediately adjacent to standing water such as edges of pools and drains, tiny cracks at the base of marine couch stems or elevated areas within depressions as it is ideal for both ovipositing and larval habitat. The highest A. vigilax larval densities occur in drainage areas from September to January and in the early dry season in May, which indicates that it is the most productive breeding site.

== Vector of diseases ==
A. vigilax is a major vector for Ross River virus and Barmah Forest virus; the two arboviruses that constitute the majority of arbovirus infections in Australia. Larval nutrition affects the ability of adult mosquitoes to become infected with and transmit arboviruses. These viruses can cause polyarthritis, fever and rash. When the body of A. vigilax was infected with the viruses, there was a 93.6±2.8% chance of transmission. A. vigilax lacks infection barriers, which is probably one reason for the high vector status of A. vigilax in eastern and northern Australia. Once the Barmah Forest virus reaches the salivary glands of the mosquitoes, they are highly efficient at transmitting them. No correlation was found between the Ross River virus competence of A. vigilax and the nutritional level.

A. vigilax is an important vector of diurnally subperiodic Wuchereria bancrofti in New Caledonia.

A. vigilax uses vertebrate hosts. Documented hosts include people, dogs, birds, brushtail possums, cats and flying foxes.

== Control measures ==
Increases in mosquito numbers may lead to an associated increase in mosquito-borne disease, particularly the Ross River virus and Barmah Forest virus. The sudden increase in the population is unpredictable as it depends on a mixture of weather, environmental, social and geographic factors. Extended larval and adult surveillance can be done by local residents and increased applications of pesticides and larval growth inhibitors can be administered by health departments. To reduce the egg-laying capacity of A. vigilax in succeedingly flooded areas, early seasonal hatches of A. vigilax need to be diligently controlled. Repetitive control is required in the Schoenoplectus / mangrove vegetation category in the mid-dry season to early wet season after each inundation. Control in the tide-affected reticulate areas is only required in the late dry season when tides are high enough to reach those areas. Oviposition sites and larval sites need to be administered closely.

To improve the control of mosquito spread, research aimed at developing biological and chemical controls and determining evidence and sources of resistance to insecticides need to be supported. Additionally, the impacts of increasing land-use and environmental change must also be carefully studied and addressed. For better results, existing mosquito control programmes must be reviewed regularly, and utilize a greater number of control strategies that are appropriately resourced.
