= Ross River virus =

Virus classification
- (unranked): Virus
- Realm: Riboviria
- Kingdom: Orthornavirae
- Phylum: Kitrinoviricota
- Class: Alsuviricetes
- Order: Martellivirales
- Family: Togaviridae
- Genus: Alphavirus
- Species: Alphavirus rossriver

Species of RNA virus

Ross River virus (RRV) is a small encapsulated single-strand RNA Alphavirus endemic to Australia, Papua New Guinea and other islands in the South Pacific. It is responsible for a type of mosquito-borne, non-lethal but extremely debilitating tropical disease known as Ross River fever, previously termed "epidemic polyarthritis". The virus is suspected to be enzootic in populations of various native Australian mammals, and has been found on occasion in horses.

== Classification and morphology ==
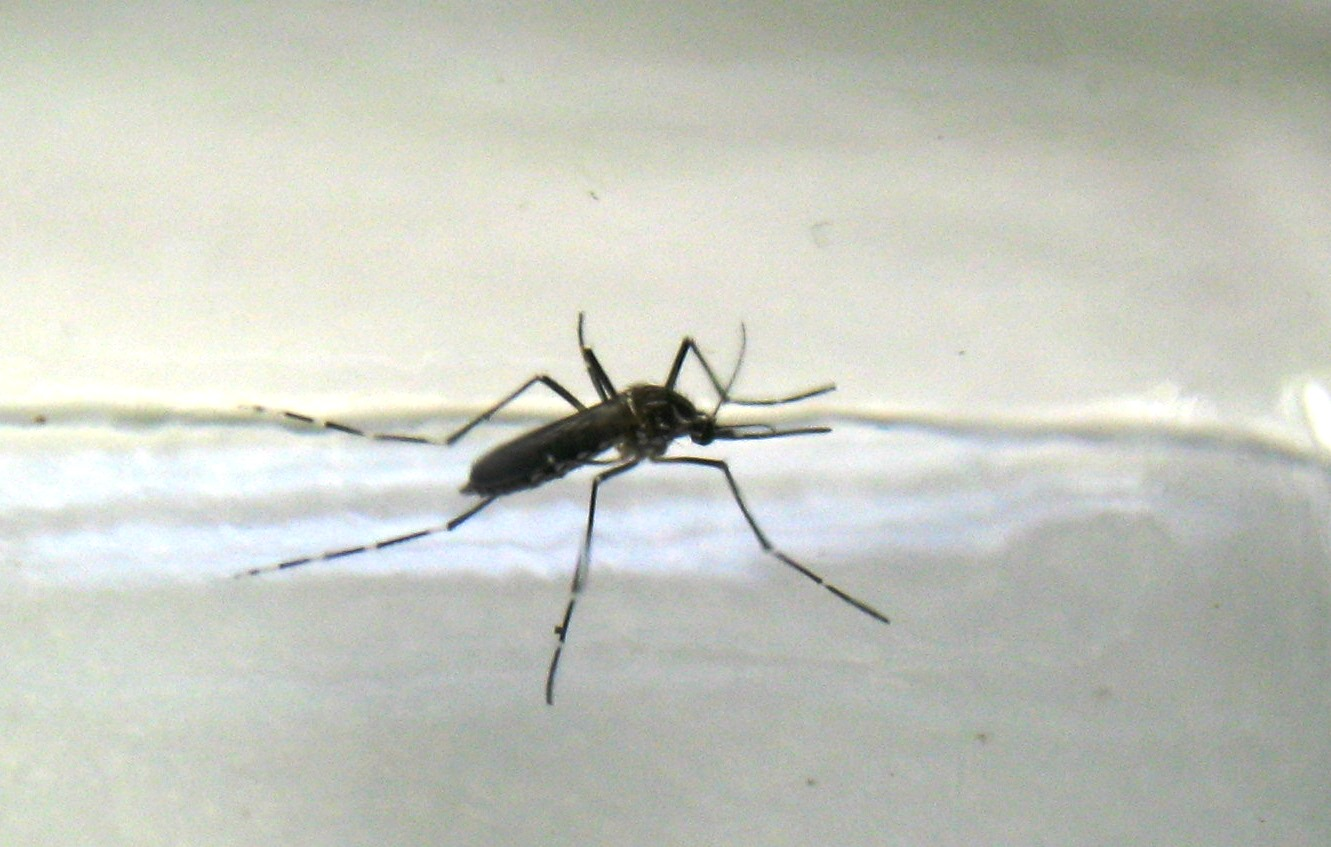
Aedes mosquito

Taxonomically, Ross River virus belongs to the virus genus Alphavirus, which is part of the family Togaviridae. The alphaviruses are a group of small enveloped single-strand positive-sense RNA viruses. RRV belongs to a subgroup of "Old World" (Eurasian-African-Australasian) alphaviruses, and belongs to the SF antigenic complex of the genus Alphavirus.

The virions (virus particles) themselves contain their genome in a protein capsid 700 Å in diameter. They are characterised by the presence of two glycoproteins (E1 and E2) embedded as trimeric dimers in a host-derived lipid envelope.

Because RRV is transmitted by mosquitos, it is considered an arbovirus, a non-taxonomic term for viruses borne by arthropod vectors.

== History ==
In 1928, an outbreak of acute febrile arthritis was recorded in Narrandera and Hay in New South Wales, Australia. In 1943, several outbreaks of arthralgia and arthritis were described in the Northern Territory, Queensland and the Schouten Islands, off the northern coast of Papua New Guinea. The name epidemic polyarthritis was coined for the disease. In 1956, an epidemic occurred in the Murray Valley which was compared to acute viral polyarthritis caused by the Chikungunya virus. The Australian disease seemed to progress in a milder fashion. In 1956, serological testing suggested an unknown new species of alphavirus (group A arbovirus) was the likely culprit.

In July and August 1956 and 1957, a virus recovered from mosquitoes collected near Tokyo, Japan, and was dubbed Sagiyama virus. For a time, it was thought to be a separate species, but is now considered conspecific with Ross River virus.

In 1959, a new alphavirus was identified in samples from a mosquito (Aedes vigilax) trapped in the Ross River, located in Townsville, Queensland, Australia. Further serological testing showed that patients who had suffered "epidemic polyarthritis" in Queensland had antibodies to the virus. The new virus was named Ross River virus, and the disease Ross River fever.

The virus itself was first isolated in 1972 using suckling mice. It was found that RRV isolated from human serum could kill mice. However, the serum containing the virus that was used had come from an Aboriginal boy from Edward River, North Queensland. The child had a fever and a rash but no arthritis, making the link between RRV and Ross River fever less than concrete.

The largest-ever outbreak of the virus was in 1979–1980 and occurred in the western Pacific. The outbreak involved the islands of Fiji, Samoa, the Cook Islands, and New Caledonia. However, RRV was later isolated in humans following a series of epidemic polyarthritis outbreaks in Fiji, Samoa and the Cook Islands during 1979. RRV was isolated in an Australian patient suffering from Ross River fever in 1985.

== Ecology ==
In rural and regional areas of Australia, the continued prevalence of Ross River virus is thought to be supported by natural reservoirs such as large marsupial mammals. Antibodies to Ross River virus have been found in a wide variety of placental and marsupial mammals, and also in a few bird species. It is not presently known what reservoir hosts support Ross River virus in metropolitan areas such as Brisbane.

The southern saltmarsh mosquito (Aedes camptorhynchus), which is known to carry the Ross River virus, was discovered in Napier, New Zealand, in 1998. Due to an 11-year program by the New Zealand Ministry of Health, and later the Ministry of Agriculture & Fisheries, the species was declared completely eradicated from New Zealand in July 2010. As of September 2006, there has never been a report of a case of Ross River virus acquired within New Zealand.

Separate mosquito species may act as vector, widespread across areas and seasonal/geographical locations. In southern and northern regions, the Aedes group (A. camptorhynchus and A. vigilax) are the main RRV carriers. However, inland the Culex annulirostris is the main carrier with Aedes mosquitoes becoming active during wet seasons.

== Western Australia ==
A Ross River virus warning sign at Thomsons Lake, Perth, Western Australia

Due to the expansion and housing demand in the south west of Western Australia, residential development is occurring closer to wetlands in spite of the fact that the ecosystem is known for mosquito breeding, particularly in the Peel region where living near water is desirable for aesthetic value. Over the decade of June 2011 – 2012 the population increased by 44,000 residents averaging a rate of 4.5 per cent per annum. In June 2013 the Peel region accounted for approximately five per cent of the State's population and predicted to account for around 6.7 per cent of Western Australia's population by 2031.

A study comparing the risk of contracting Ross River virus (RRV) and the distance of the dwellings from Muddy Lakes. The reports showed within a one kilometre buffer zone there were approximately 1550 mosquitos in traps per night with 89% of them being Ae. camptorhynchus decreasing to approximately 450 mosquitos with 57% Ae. camptorhynchus at the six kilometre buffer zone. The study suggests that there is a significantly higher risk of contracting RRV when living closer to Muddy Lakes however, there was a rise in the two kilometre buffer zone of 3700 mosquitos with 94% Ae. camptorhynchus. A similar trend in the study same study conducted in the Peel region resulting in less mosquitoes the further away the buffer distance.

In 1995–96 Leschenault and Capel-Busselton were affected by an outbreak of 524 cases of RRV disease. Although this occurred around a decade ago, the data analysed the total RRV cases per 1000 persons for each 500m buffer zone. This shows an elevated risk of contracting the disease if living in close proximity to the Leschenault Estuary, within 2 km being the strongest disease risk gradient.

Evidence shows that there is a strong correlation between contracting RRV when living in close proximity to wetlands in the south west of Western Australia. However, due to continuous growth and development of residential areas around these wetlands it is expected that problems with RRV disease will occur.

== Risks ==
There are several factors that can contribute to an individual's risk for Ross River virus in Australia. These risks were trialed in a study conducted in tropical Australia which illustrate that factors such as camping, light coloured clothing, exposure to certain flora and fauna and specific protective mechanisms are able to increase or decrease the likelihood of contracting the virus. By increasing the frequency of camping the individual's risk increases eight-fold, suggesting that an increased exposure to wildlife increases risk. This is shown by the narrow 95% confidence interval of 1.07–4.35 within the study. For example, an individual's exposure to kangaroos, wallabies and bromeliad plants also increased risk, suggesting that they are reservoirs for infection, breeding sites for mosquitoes and potential vectors of the virus. Ross River virus antibodies have been found in captive populations of tammar wallabies and wallaroos in urban areas in New South Wales, Australia, and are potential reservoirs for the virus. Although these areas show a higher risk for the virus, humans should still enjoy the wildlife but consider that preventive mechanisms as increasingly important while camping.

== Prevention ==
Ross River virus can be easily prevented through small behavioural mechanisms which should be of high importance in tropical areas and during participation of outdoor activities. Firstly, insect repellent should be rigorously used as to prevent bites from insects that specifically include mosquitoes which are vectors that carry the disease. A study in tropical Australia shows a very narrow 95% confidence interval of 0.20–1.00 for a decrease in Ross River virus risk as a result of increased use of insect repellent, suggesting a strong correlation between the two. Following, burning citronella candles are based on the same principle, that it repels insects that are vectors of the virus. Burning such candles also show a strong correlation with decreased Ross River virus risk shown in the same study with a narrow 95% confidence interval of 0.10–0.78. Secondly, wearing light coloured clothing decrease the risk of Ross River virus three-fold. This is again based on the repelling of vectors such as mosquitoes through the use of bright colours. Lastly, high risk areas should be minimised by mechanisms of prevention that are applied within households. For example, screens should be fitted to windows and doors to prevent entry of insects carrying the virus and potential breeding areas such as open water containers or water holding plants should be removed. Therefore, specific climatic environments should be assessed for high risk factors and the appropriate precautions should be taken in response.

== Lab research ==
The study of RRV has been recently facilitated by a mouse model. Inbred mice infected with RRV develop hind-limb arthritis/arthralgia. The disease in mice, similar to humans, is characterised by an inflammatory infiltrate including macrophages which are immunopathogenic and exacerbate disease. Furthermore, recent data indicate that the serum component, C3, directly contributes to disease since mice deficient in the C3 protein do not suffer from severe disease following infection.

== Symptoms ==
Ross River virus can cause multiple symptoms in someone who is infected, the most common being arthritis or joint pain. Other symptoms include a rash on the limbs of the body, which often occurs roughly 10 days after arthritis begins. Lymph nodes may enlarge, most commonly in the arm pits or groin region, and rarely a feeling of 'pins and needles' in the persons hands and feet, but only occurs in a small number of people. The virus also causes moderate symptoms in horses.

The symptoms of Ross River virus are important to recognise for early diagnosis and therefore early treatment. Symptoms have been illustrated in a case report of an infected Thuringian traveller returning from South-East Australia. This case showed flu-like symptoms that include fever, chills, headache and pains in the body. Additionally, joint pain arose in which some joints become swollen and joint stiffness was particularly noticeable. A clinical examination of the infected individual shows a significant decrease of specific antibodies despite the normal blood count levels. A rash is a good indication that is likely to occur but usually disappears after ten days. The symptoms of Ross River virus are important to be aware of so that early treatment can be administered before the virus worsens. The time between catching the disease and experiencing symptoms is anywhere between three days to three weeks, usually it takes about 1–2 weeks. A person can be tested for Ross River virus by a blood test, other illnesses may need to be excluded before diagnosis.

== Diagnosis ==
Testing for Ross River virus should occur in patients who are experiencing acute polyarthritis, tiredness and/or rashes (~90%) with a history of travel within areas prone to infection from the virus. Serology (blood tests) is the appropriate manner by which to diagnose Ross River virus. Within seven days of infection, the virus produces Immunoglobulin M ((IgM) and is a presumptive positive diagnosis. IgM may persist for months or even years and therefore false positives may be triggered by Barmah Forest virus, rubella, Q fever or rheumatoid factor. To completely test for Ross River virus, a second serology test must be conducted 10–14 days after the first. The patient may then be declared positive for Ross River virus infection if there is a four-fold increase of IgM antibody count.

== Ross River fever ==
Ross River fever is also known as Ross River virus infection or Ross River virus disease. Ross River virus is named after the Ross River in Townsville, which is the place where it was first identified. Ross River fever is the most common mosquito-borne disease in Australia, and nearly 5000 people are reported to be infected with the virus each year.
