= Notifiable diseases in Switzerland =

Diseases which must be reported to Swiss authorities

A notifiable disease is one which the law requires to be reported to government authorities. In Switzerland, the Federal Office of Public Health is in charge of tracking the notifiable diseases.

== List of notifiable diseases in Switzerland ==
This is the list of notifiable diseases in Switzerland for 2020.

Notifiable diseases in Switzerland
Disease	Pathogen
Anthrax	Bacillus anthracis
Botulism	Clostridium botulinum
Brucellosis	Brucella spp.
Campylobacteriosis	Campylobacter spp.
	Carbapenemase producing Enterobacteriaceae
Chikungunya fever	Chikungunya virus
Chlamydiosis	Chlamydia trachomatis
Cholera	Vibrio cholerae
Creutzfeldt Jakob disease	prions
Dengue fever	Dengue virus
Diphtheria	Corynebacterium diphtheriae and other toxin-producing corynebacteria
Ebola	Ebola virus
EHEC infection	EHEC
Tick-borne encephalitis	TBE virus
Yellow fever	Yellow fever virus
Gonorrhoea	Neisseria gonorrhoeae
Haemophilus influenzae - diseases, invasive	
Hanta fever	Hanta virus
Hepatitis A	Hepatitis A virus
Hepatitis B	Hepatitis B virus
Hepatitis C	Hepatitis C virus
Hepatitis E	Hepatitis E virus
AIDS	HIV virus
Influenza new subtype	Influenza A virus HxNy (potentially pandemic)
Influenza seasonal flu	Influenza viruses
Crimean-Congo fever	Crimean Congo virus
Lassa fever	Lassa virus
Legionnaires' disease	Legionella spp.
Listeriosis	Listeria monocytogenes
Malaria	Plasmodium spp.
Marburg fever	Marburg virus
Measles	Measles virus
Meningococcal diseases, invasive	Neisseria meningitidis
MERS	MERS Coronavirus
Plague	Yersinia pestis
Pneumococcal disease, invasive	Streptococcus pneumoniae
Smallpox	Smallpox virus
Q fever	Q fever virus
Polio	Polio virus
Rubella	Rubella virus
Salmonellosis	Salmonella spp.
Shigellosis	Shigella spp.
Syphilis	Treponema pallidum
Tetanus	Clostridium tetani
Rabies	Rabies virus
Trichinosis	Trichinella spiralis
Tuberculosis	Mycobacterium tuberculosis complex
Tularemia	Francisella tularensis
Typhoid/ Paratyphoid fever	Salmonella typhi/paratyphi
West Nile fever	West Nile virus
Zika virus infection	Zika virus
