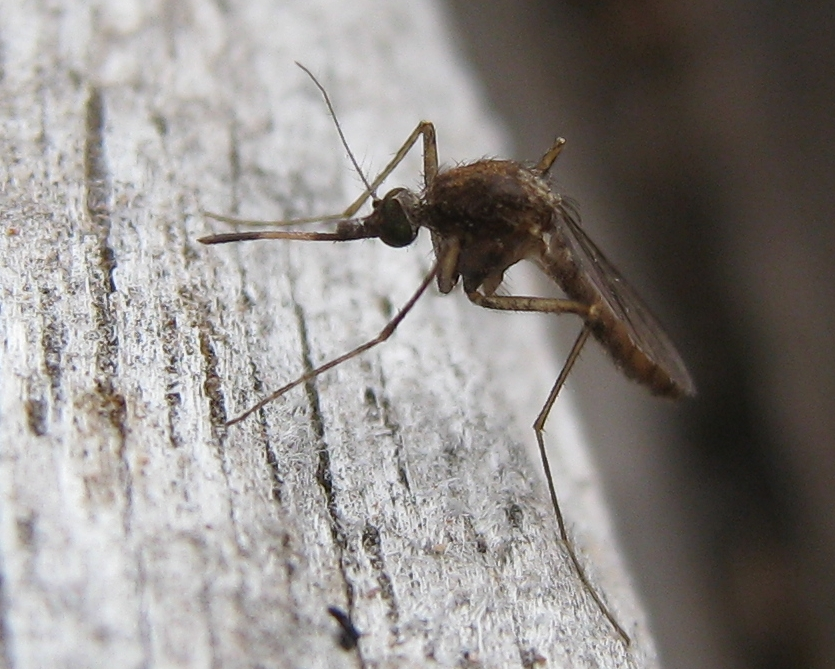
- Adult female

Scientific classification
- Kingdom: Animalia
- Phylum: Arthropoda
- Clade: Pancrustacea
- Class: Insecta
- Order: Diptera
- Family: Culicidae
- Genus: Culex
- Subgenus: Culex
- Species: C. annulirostris

Binomial name
- Culex annulirostris Skuse, 1889

Synonyms
- Culex bancroftii Theobald, 1901; Culex cheni Ho, 1963; Culex jepsoni Bahr, 1912; Culex palmi Baisas, 1938; Culex someresti Taylor, 1912; Culicelsa consimilis Taylor, 1913; Culicelsa simplex Taylor, 1914

= Culex annulirostris =

Species of mosquito

Culex annulirostris, commonly known as the common banded mosquito, is a species of mosquito in the genus Culex, native to parts of Oceania and southeast Asia. It is a vector for a number of pathogens and is regarded as a serious pest species throughout its range.

== Description ==
Adults medium-sized. Body dark creamy brown with narrow bronze and gold scales on scutum, not arranged in a distinct pattern. Proboscis dark-scaled with pale band on central third (broader than that of the otherwise similar Cx. sitiens). Legs dark with mottled pale scales. Tarsi dark with narrow pale bands basally, except tarsus 5, which is entirely dark. Wings dark-scaled. Abdominal tergites and sternites dark-scaled with pale bands basally, often extending to a medial point on tergites.

== Taxonomy ==
Frederick Askew Skuse described Cx. annulirostris in 1889 from specimens collected in the Blue Mountains and Berowra, New South Wales. The species name is derived from the Latin words annulus ('ring') and rostrum ('bill').

Evidence suggests that Cx. annulirostris may represent a species complex, consisting of an unknown number of cryptic species that differ in vectorial capacity.

== Distribution ==
Culex annulirostris is native to Australia (mainland only), Cook Islands, Fiji, Indonesia, Kiribati, Micronesia, Nauru, New Caledonia, Palau, Papua New Guinea, the Philippines, Solomon Islands, Tonga, Tuvalu, and Vanuatu.

== Ecology ==
Breeding takes place anywhere there is standing water, from swamps and ponds to all kinds of artificial puddles—irrigation channels, bamboo stumps, cacao shells, the bottoms of canoes. The water can be clean or polluted, in sun or shade, and fresh or brackish.

The adult mosquitoes are active between spring and late autumn. During this time they appear most commonly at dawn and dusk, though they can also be active during the day and indoors. They can travel 5–10 km from their place of birth and feed on mammals and birds. Like all blood-feeding mosquitoes, it is only the female that feeds on blood as it needs to consume protein for reproduction. The male only feeds on nectar.

== Pest status ==
Culex annulirostris is an important vector for a number of arboviruses, including Murray Valley encephalitis virus, Ross River virus, Barmah Forest virus, Kunjin virus and Japanese encephalitis, as well as dog heartworm and the roundworm Wuchereria bancrofti in New Guinea. It may carry myxomatosis.
