= Murray Valley encephalitis virus =

Virus classification
- (unranked): Virus
- Realm: Riboviria
- Kingdom: Orthornavirae
- Phylum: Kitrinoviricota
- Class: Flasuviricetes
- Order: Amarillovirales
- Family: Flaviviridae
- Genus: Orthoflavivirus
- Subgenus: Euflavivirus
- Species: Orthoflavivirus murrayense

Insect-borne viral disease

Murray Valley encephalitis virus
- Specialty: Infectious disease

Murray Valley encephalitis virus (MVEV) is a zoonotic flavivirus endemic to northern Australia and Papua New Guinea. It is the causal agent of Murray Valley encephalitis (MVE; previously known as Australian encephalitis or Australian X disease). In humans, it can cause permanent neurological disease or death. MVEV is related to Kunjin virus, which has a similar ecology, but a lower morbidity rate. Although the arbovirus is endemic to Northern Australia, it has occasionally spread to the southern states during times of heavy rainfall during the summer monsoon season via seasonal flooding of the Murray-Darling River system. These outbreaks can be "...decades apart, with no or very few cases identified in between".

== Vector ==
MVEV is a mosquito-borne virus that is maintained in a bird-mosquito-bird cycle. Water birds from the order Ciconiiformes, including herons and cormorants, provide the natural reservoir for MVEV. The major mosquito vector is Culex annulirostris. Human infection occurs only through bites from infected mosquitoes; the virus cannot be transmitted from person to person.

== History ==
The first epidemics of MVE occurred in 1917 and 1918 in Southeastern Australia following years of high rainfall. The virus was isolated from human samples in 1951 during an epidemic in the Murray Valley, Australia.

Epidemics usually occur due to either infected birds or mosquitoes migrating from endemic areas to non-endemic areas. The New South Wales government has placed 'sentinel flocks' of chickens near known bird breeding sites as an early warning system. These flocks are tested for MVE during the mosquito breeding season.

== Presentation ==
The majority of MVEV infections are sub-clinical, i.e. do not produce disease symptoms, although some people may experience a mild form of the disease with symptoms such as fever, headaches, nausea and vomiting and only a very small number of these cases go on to develop MVE. In fact, serological surveys which measure the level of anti-MVEV antibodies within the population estimate that only one in 800–1000 of all infections result in clinical disease.

The incubation period following exposure to the virus is around 1 to 4 weeks. Following infection, a person has lifelong immunity to the virus. When a patient appears to show MVE symptoms and has been in an MVE-endemic area during the wet season, when outbreaks usually occur, MVE infection must be confirmed by laboratory diagnosis, usually by detection of a significant rise of MVE-specific antibodies in the patient's serum. Of those who contract MVE, one-quarter die from the disease.

== Clone ==
The scientific study of the genetics of MVEV has been facilitated by the construction and manipulation of an infectious cDNA clone of the virus. Mutations in the envelope gene have been linked to the attenuation of disease in mouse models of infection.
