= Polyarthritis =

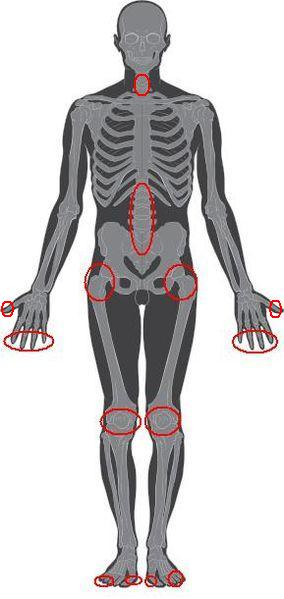
- Osteoarthritis (OA) location on the skeleton anterior
- Specialty: Rheumatology

Polyarthritis is any type of arthritis that involves five or more joints simultaneously. It can be associated with autoimmune conditions; it may be experienced at any age and is not sex specific.

== Causes ==
Polyarthritis may be caused by an auto-immune disorder such as rheumatoid arthritis, psoriatic arthritis, and lupus erythematosus, or other inflammatory rheumatic diseases, like crystal arthropathies. It can also be caused by cancer or various medications.

If polyarthritis symptoms last less than six weeks, it is defined as acute polyarthritis: longer than six weeks indicates chronic polyarthritis.

Another cause of polyarthritis is infection, which may be viral or bacterial.

=== Viral polyarthritis ===
Viruses that cause polyarthritis include alphaviruses, such as chikungunya virus, Sindbis virus and Ross River virus.

=== Bacterial polyarthritis ===
Arthritis caused by bacterial infection of the joint is termed septic arthritis and does not commonly affect multiple joints. It may notably be caused by gonococcus. Bacteria can also cause polyarthritis not by directly infecting the joints; instead, infection located elsewhere in the body can cause immune reaction, which becomes the direct cause of the inflammation of joints. This form or arthritis is called reactive and often coexists with inflammation of the urethra, and of the conjuctiva in the eye.

== See also ==
- Polyarteritis nodosa
