= Kunjin virus =

Virus classification
- (unranked): Virus
- Realm: Riboviria
- Kingdom: Orthornavirae
- Phylum: Kitrinoviricota
- Class: Flasuviricetes
- Order: Amarillovirales
- Family: Flaviviridae
- Genus: Flavivirus
- Species: Orthoflavivirus nilense
- Serotype: Kunjin virus

Subtype of West Nile virus

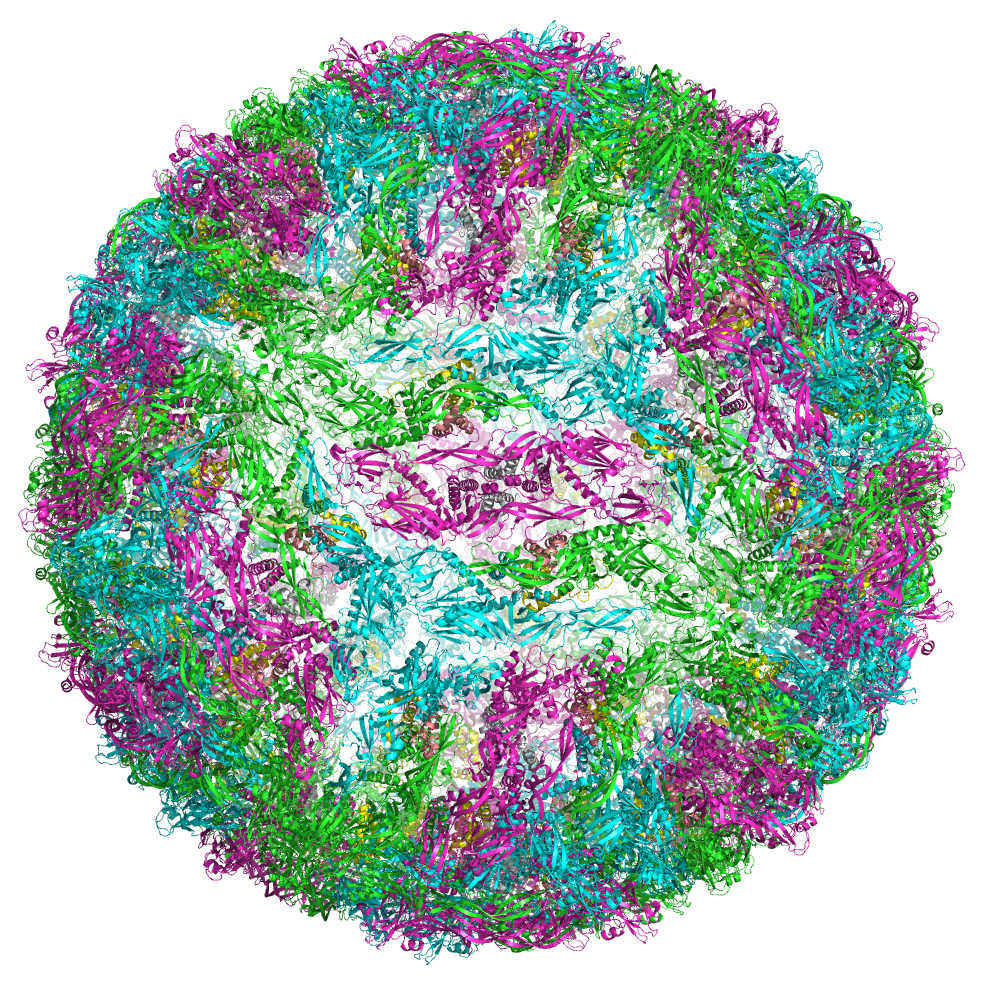
Ribbon representation of the assembly of Kunjin virus from 60 sets of Envelope and Matrix proteins

Kunjin virus (KUNV) is a zoonotic virus of the family Flaviviridae and the genus Flavivirus. It is a subtype of West Nile virus endemic to Oceania.

== History ==
The virus was first isolated from Culex annulirostris mosquitoes in Australia in 1960. The name of Kunjin virus derives from an Aboriginal clan living on the Mitchell River close to where the virus was first isolated in Kowanyama, northern Queensland.

== Virology ==
Kunjin virus is a zoonotic virus of the family Flaviviridae and the genus Flavivirus. It is an arbovirus which is transmitted by mosquitoes and is part of the Japanese encephalitis serological complex. It is antigenically and genetically very similar to West Nile virus and in 1999 was reclassified as a subtype of WNV. Its genome is positive-sense single stranded RNA made up of 10,644 nucleotides.

== Symptoms and prognosis ==
Infection with the virus often causes no symptoms, but it can lead to either an encephalitic disease or a non-encephalitic disease. Non-encephalitic Kunjin virus disease can cause symptoms including acute febrile illness, headache, arthralgia, myalgia, fatigue and rash. Kunjin virus encephalitis features acute febrile meningoencephalitis.

Both forms of Kunjin virus disease are milder than the diseases caused by West Nile virus and Murray Valley encephalitis virus.

== Transmission and control ==
Kunjin virus is transmitted by mosquito vectors, especially the Culex annulirostris. They pass the virus to waterbird reservoir hosts; a major example is the nankeen night heron. It is also passed to horses and humans. The virus has been isolated in mosquitoes in South East Asia but in humans, only in Australia. It has been found all over Australia and is particularly prevalent in areas near wetlands and rivers.

The control of Kunjin virus is achieved in the same ways as other mosquito-borne diseases. These include individuals using insect repellent, wearing long-sleeved clothes and avoiding areas where mosquitoes are particularly prevalent. Habitat control by government agencies can take the form of reducing the amount of water available for mosquitoes to breed in, and the use of insecticides. There is no available vaccine against Kunjin virus.

== Use in medicine ==
In 2005, scientists at the Queensland Institute of Medical Research and the University of Queensland found that modified Kunjin virus particles injected into mice were able to deliver a gene into the immune system targeting cancer cells. This research may lead to vaccines for cancer and HIV.
