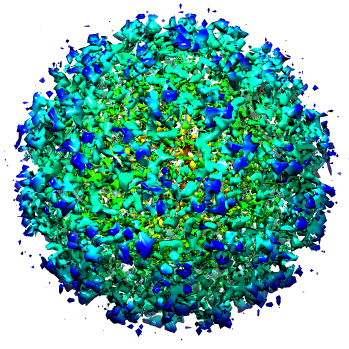
- Structure of Barmah Forest virus by cryo-electron microscopy. EMD-1886

Virus classification
- (unranked): Virus
- Realm: Riboviria
- Kingdom: Orthornavirae
- Phylum: Kitrinoviricota
- Class: Alsuviricetes
- Order: Martellivirales
- Family: Togaviridae
- Genus: Alphavirus
- Species: Alphavirus barmah

= Barmah Forest virus =

Species of virus

Barmah Forest virus is an RNA virus in the genus Alphavirus. The virus is named after the Barmah Forest in the northern Victoria region of Australia, where it was first isolated in 1974. It is passed to vertebrate hosts almost exclusively by mosquitoes, the first case in humans being documented in 1986. It is widespread in Australia and there is some evidence of local transmission in Papua New Guinea.

Although there is no specific treatment for infection with the Barmah Forest virus, the disease is non-fatal and most infected people recover. The virus has gradually spread from the sub-tropical northern areas of Victoria to the coastal regions of New South Wales, Queensland and Western Australia (WA). People are more likely to contract the disease in summer and autumn in Australia. In the south west of WA, however, spring has been found to have the highest incidence.

== Transmission ==
The virus can only be transmitted to humans by bites from infected mosquitoes. A number of mosquito species have been associated with vectoring the virus, including the Aedes vigilax and Culex annulirostris mosquito species. Direct contact with an infected person or animal does not cause infection. The virus is hosted mainly by marsupials, especially possums, kangaroos and wallabies.

== Symptoms ==
Symptoms include fever, malaise, rash, arthralgia, and muscle tenderness. Fever and malaise generally disappear within a few days to a week, but other symptoms such as joint pain may continue for six months or longer.

The Barmah Forest virus causes similar symptoms as the Ross River virus, although they usually persist longer in persons infected with the latter.

Most people may recover within a few weeks, but the minority can continue to have the symptoms for many months, and in the most severe cases, up to a year. A full recovery will be expected.

== Diagnosis ==
The Barmah Forest virus is diagnosed by examination of blood serum collected from potentially infected people.

== Documented cases ==
Barmah Forest virus is the second most prevalent arbovirus in Australia.

During the years of 1995–2008, 15592 cases of Barmah Forest virus were recorded in Australia. Of these, Queensland recorded the highest number of cases being 8050, which was over 50% of all cases. In 2011, 1855 people were diagnosed with Barmah Forest virus.

In recent years, there has been an increasing number of Barmah Forest virus cases in Australia. This increase could be as a result of urban development and changes to land and irrigation practices which ultimately allow for increased mosquito breeding, resulting in more outbreaks.

== Prevention ==
The type of mosquito that transmits the virus can alter: the best way to ascertain an area is affected is by contact with local Health Officers. Precautions include:

- Removing water build-up to stop mosquitos from breeding.
- In the afternoon and early evening wear light coloured clothing which is loose fitted.
- Regular use of insect repellent which can be used against mosquitos on exposed skin.
- 'Knock-down' insecticide before bed to clear out your house.
- Insect screening, including fireplaces, in hot weather.

== Treatment ==
There is currently no specific treatment for the virus. The only treatment is trying to control and get rid of the symptoms that may occur. A doctor will advise and give treatment for the joint and muscle pain which involves resting and gentle exercise (to keep joints moving) . Medication may sometimes be necessary, but not always.
