= Infection =

Invasion of an organism's body by pathogenic agents

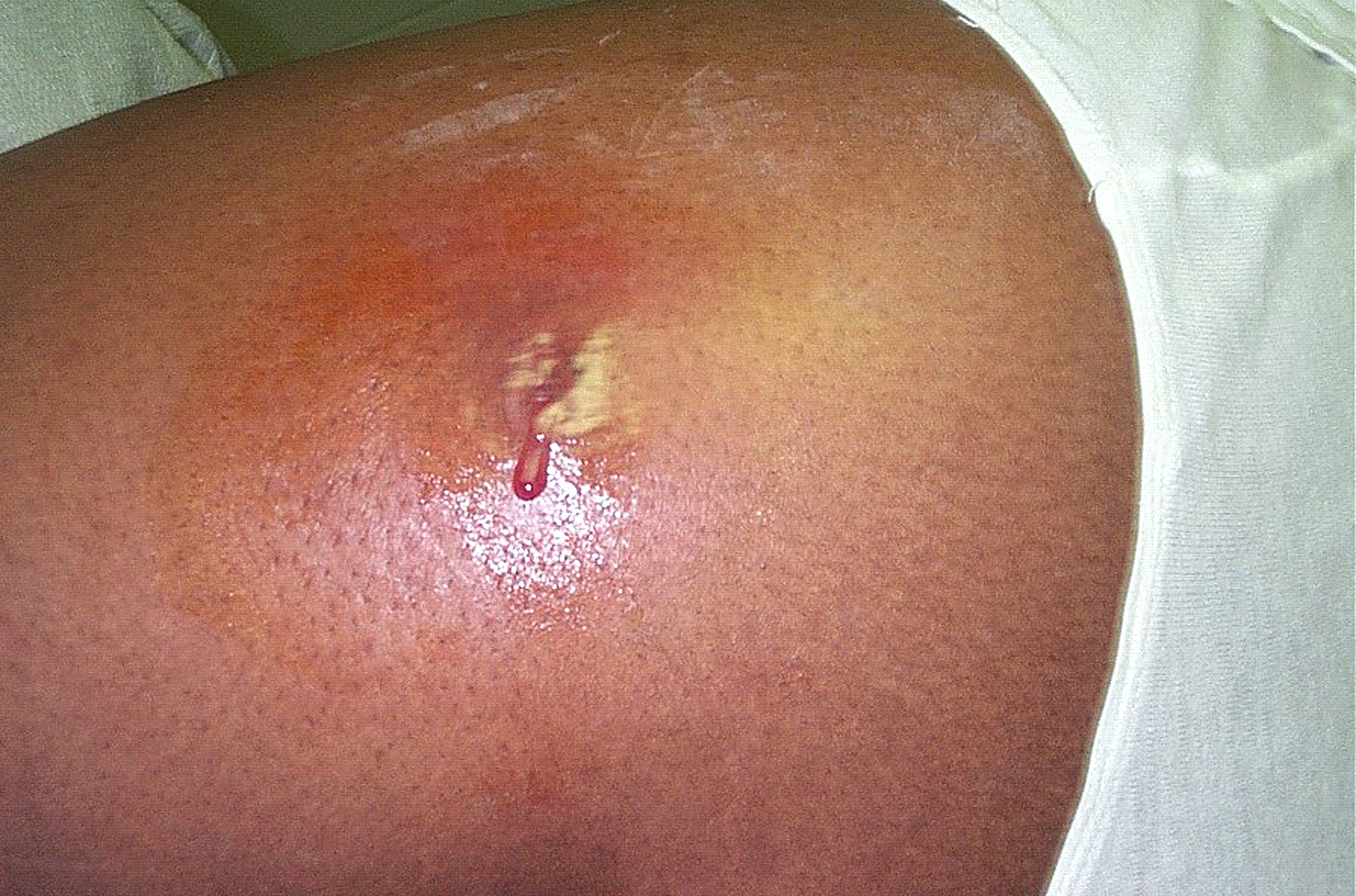
- Pus oozing from an abscess caused by bacteria
- Specialty: Infectious diseases
- Causes: Bacterial, viral, parasitic, fungal, prion

An infection is the invasion of tissues by pathogens, their multiplication, and the reaction of host tissues to the infectious agent and the toxins they produce. An infectious disease is an illness resulting from an infection, and some infectious diseases are also communicable (transmissible).

Infections can be caused by a wide range of pathogens, most prominently bacteria and viruses. Hosts can fight infections using their immune systems. Mammalian hosts react to infections with an innate response, often involving inflammation, followed by an adaptive response.

Treatment for infections depends on the type of pathogen involved. Common medications include:

- Antibiotics for bacterial infections.
- Antivirals for viral infections.
- Antifungals for fungal infections.
- Antiprotozoals for protozoan infections.
- Antihelminthics for infections caused by parasitic worms.

Infectious diseases remain a significant global health concern, causing approximately 9.2 million deaths in 2013 (17% of all deaths). The branch of medicine that focuses on infections is referred to as infectious diseases.

== Types ==
Infections are caused by infectious agents (pathogens) including:

- Bacteria (e.g. Mycobacterium tuberculosis, Staphylococcus aureus, Escherichia coli, Clostridium botulinum, and Salmonella spp.)
- Viruses and subviral agents such as viroids and prions. (E.g. HIV, Rhinovirus, Lyssaviruses such as Rabies virus, Ebolavirus and Severe acute respiratory syndrome coronavirus 2)
- Fungi, further subclassified into:
  - Ascomycota, including yeasts such as Candida (the most common fungal infection); filamentous fungi such as Aspergillus; Pneumocystis species; and dermatophytes, a group of organisms causing infection of skin and other superficial structures in humans.
  - Basidiomycota, including the human-pathogenic genus Cryptococcus.
- Parasites, which are usually divided into:
  - Unicellular organisms (e.g. malaria, Toxoplasma, Babesia)
  - Macroparasites (worms or helminths) including nematodes such as parasitic roundworms and pinworms, tapeworms (cestodes), and flukes (trematodes, such as schistosomes). Diseases caused by helminths are sometimes termed infestations, but are sometimes called infections.
  - Arthropods such as ticks, mites, fleas, and lice, can also cause human disease, which conceptually are similar to infections, but invasion of a human or animal body by these macroparasites is usually termed infestation.

== Signs and symptoms ==
The signs and symptoms of an infection depend on the type of disease. Some signs of infection affect the whole body generally, such as fatigue, loss of appetite, weight loss, fevers, night sweats, chills, aches and pains. Others are specific to individual body parts, such as skin rashes, coughing, or a runny nose.

In certain cases, infectious diseases may be asymptomatic for much or even all of their course in a given host. In the latter case, the disease may only be defined as a "disease" (which by definition means an illness) in hosts who secondarily become ill after contact with an asymptomatic carrier. An infection is not synonymous with an infectious disease, as some infections do not cause illness in a host.

=== Bacterial or viral ===
As bacterial and viral infections can both cause the same kinds of symptoms, it can be difficult to distinguish which is the cause of a specific infection. Distinguishing the two is important, since viral infections cannot be cured by antibiotics whereas bacterial infections can.

Comparison of viral and bacterial infection
| Characteristic | Viral infection | Bacterial infection |
|---|---|---|
| Typical symptoms | In general, viral infections are systemic. This means they involve many different parts of the body or more than one body system at the same time; i.e. a runny nose, sinus congestion, cough, body aches etc. They can be local at times as in viral conjunctivitis or "pink eye" and herpes. Only a few viral infections are painful, like herpes. The pain of viral infections is often described as itchy or burning. | The classic symptoms of a bacterial infection are localized redness, heat, swelling and pain. One of the hallmarks of a bacterial infection is local pain, pain that is in a specific part of the body. For example, if a cut occurs and is infected with bacteria, pain occurs at the site of the infection. Bacterial throat pain is often characterized by more pain on one side of the throat. An ear infection is more likely to be diagnosed as bacterial if the pain occurs in only one ear. A cut that produces pus and milky-colored liquid is most likely infected. |
| Cause | Pathogenic viruses | Pathogenic bacteria |

== Pathophysiology ==
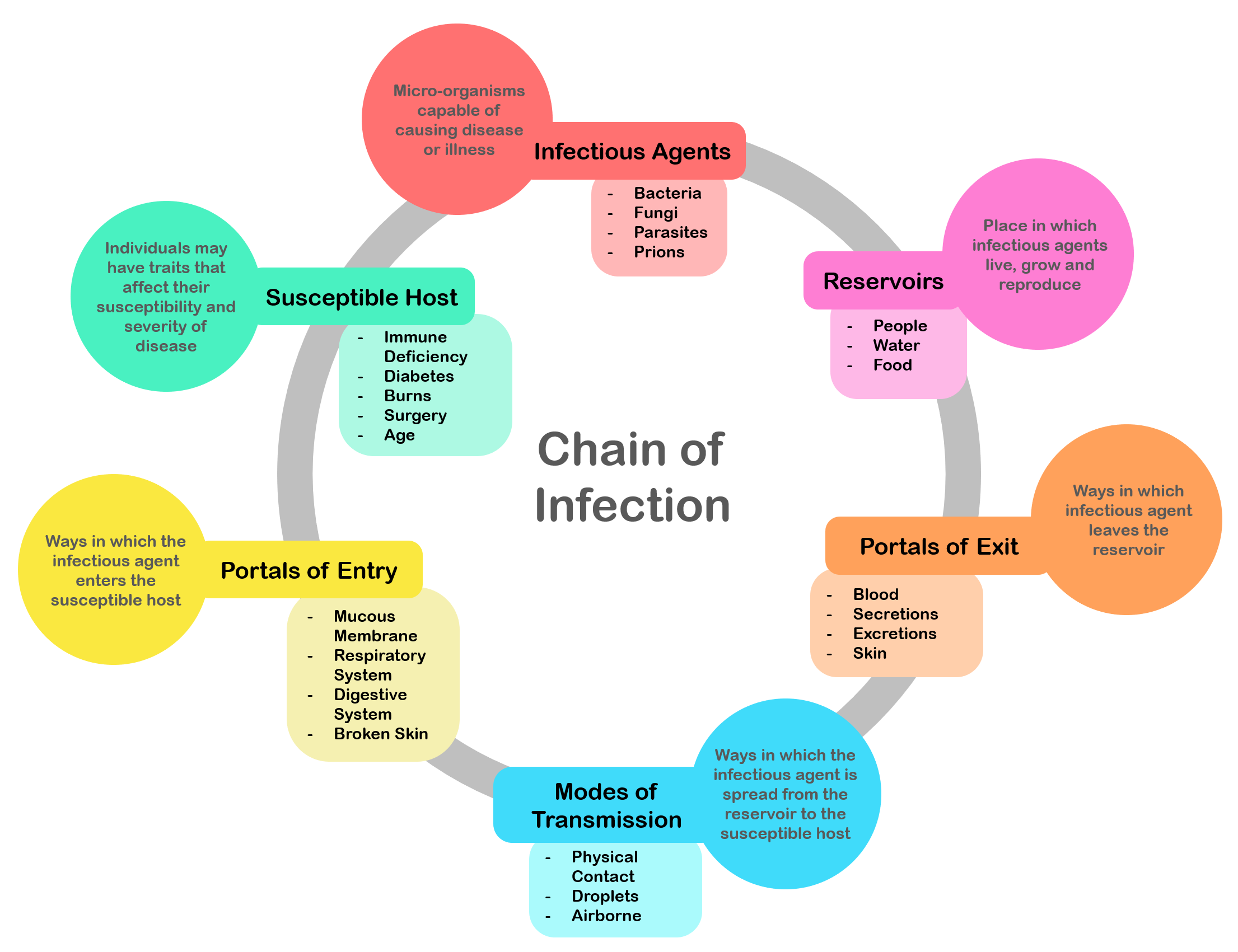
Chain of infection; the chain of events that lead to infection

There is a general chain of events that applies to infections, sometimes called the chain of infection or transmission chain. The chain of events involves several steps – which include the infectious agent, reservoir, entering a susceptible host, exit and transmission to new hosts. Each of the links must be present in a chronological order for an infection to develop. Understanding these steps helps health care workers target the infection and prevent it from occurring in the first place.

=== Colonization ===
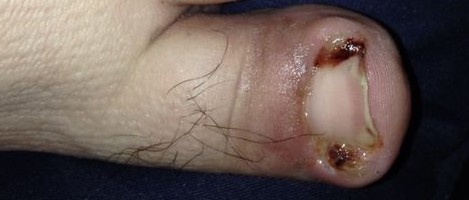
Infection of an ingrown toenail; there is pus (yellow) and resultant inflammation (redness and swelling around the nail).

Infection begins when an organism successfully enters the body, grows and multiplies. This is referred to as colonization. Most humans are not easily infected. Those with compromised or weakened immune systems have an increased susceptibility to chronic or persistent infections. Individuals who have a suppressed immune system are particularly susceptible to opportunistic infections. Entrance to the host at host–pathogen interface, generally occurs through the mucosa in orifices like the oral cavity, nose, eyes, genitalia, anus, or the microbe can enter through open wounds. While a few organisms can grow at the initial site of entry, many migrate and cause systemic infection in different organs. Some pathogens grow within the host cells (intracellular) whereas others grow freely in bodily fluids.

Wound colonization refers to non-replicating microorganisms within the wound, while in infected wounds, replicating organisms exist and tissue is injured. All multicellular organisms are colonized to some degree by extrinsic organisms, and the vast majority of these exist in either a mutualistic or commensal relationship with the host. An example of the former is the anaerobic bacteria species, which colonizes the mammalian colon, and an example of the latter are the various species of staphylococcus that exist on human skin. Neither of these colonizations are considered infections. The difference between an infection and a colonization is often only a matter of circumstance. Non-pathogenic organisms can become pathogenic given specific conditions, and even the most virulent organism requires certain circumstances to cause a compromising infection. Some colonizing bacteria, such as Corynebacteria sp. and Viridans streptococci, prevent the adhesion and colonization of pathogenic bacteria and thus have a symbiotic relationship with the host, preventing infection and speeding wound healing.

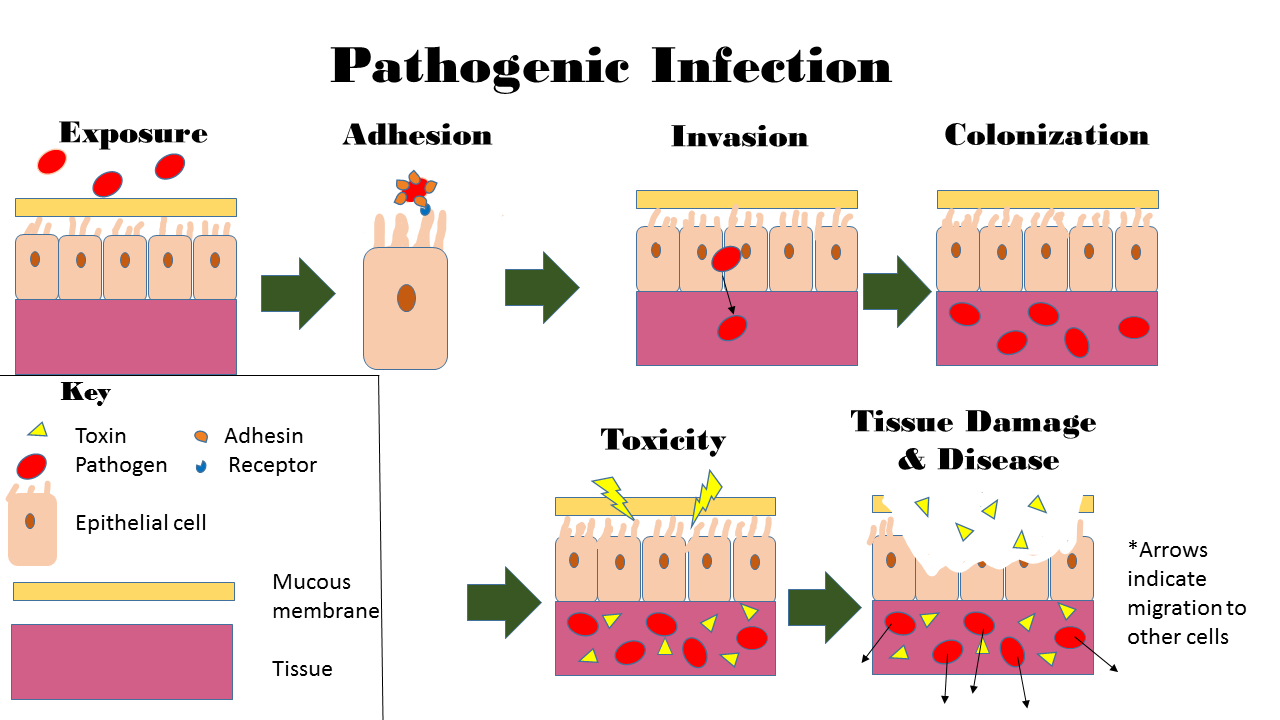
This image depicts the steps of pathogenic infection.

The variables involved in the outcome of a host becoming inoculated by a pathogen and the ultimate outcome include:

- the route of entry of the pathogen and the access to host regions that it gains
- the intrinsic virulence of the particular organism
- the quantity or load of the initial inoculant
- the immune status of the host being colonized

As an example, several staphylococcal species remain harmless on the skin, but, when present in a normally sterile space, such as in the capsule of a joint or the peritoneum, multiply without resistance and cause harm.

An interesting fact that gas chromatography–mass spectrometry, 16S ribosomal RNA analysis, omics, and other advanced technologies have made more apparent to humans in recent decades is that microbial colonization is very common even in environments that humans think of as being nearly sterile. Because it is normal to have bacterial colonization, it is difficult to know which chronic wounds can be classified as infected and how much risk of progression exists. Despite the huge number of wounds seen in clinical practice, there are limited quality data for evaluated symptoms and signs. A review of chronic wounds in the Journal of the American Medical Association's "Rational Clinical Examination Series" quantified the importance of increased pain as an indicator of infection. The review showed that the most useful finding is an increase in the level of pain [likelihood ratio (LR) range, 11–20] makes infection much more likely, but the absence of pain (negative likelihood ratio range, 0.64–0.88) does not rule out infection (summary LR 0.64–0.88).

=== Disease ===
Disease can arise if the host's protective immune mechanisms are compromised and the organism inflicts damage on the host. Microorganisms can cause tissue damage by releasing a variety of toxins or destructive enzymes. For example, Clostridium tetani releases a toxin that paralyzes muscles, and staphylococcus releases toxins that produce shock and sepsis. Not all infectious agents cause disease in all hosts. For example, less than 5% of individuals infected with polio develop disease. On the other hand, some infectious agents are highly virulent. The prion causing mad cow disease and Creutzfeldt–Jakob disease invariably kills all animals and people that are infected.

Persistent infections occur because the body is unable to clear the organism after the initial infection. Persistent infections are characterized by the continual presence of the infectious organism, often as latent infection with occasional recurrent relapses of active infection. There are some viruses that can maintain a persistent infection by infecting different cells of the body. Some viruses once acquired never leave the body. A typical example is the herpes virus, which tends to hide in nerves and become reactivated when specific circumstances arise.

Persistent infections cause millions of deaths globally each year. Chronic infections by parasites account for a high morbidity and mortality in many underdeveloped countries.

=== Transmission ===
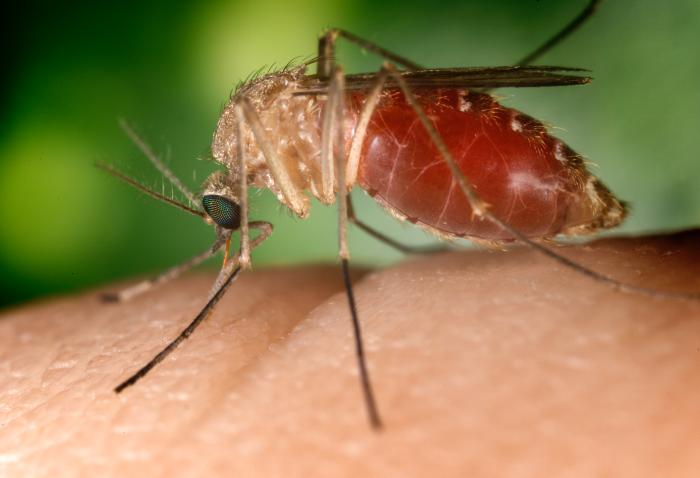
A southern house mosquito (Culex quinquefasciatus) is a vector that transmits the pathogens that cause West Nile fever and avian malaria among others.

For infecting organisms to survive and repeat the infection cycle in other hosts, they (or their progeny) must leave an existing reservoir and cause infection elsewhere. Infection transmission can take place via many potential routes:

- Droplet contact, also known as the respiratory route, and the resultant infection can be termed airborne disease. If an infected person coughs or sneezes on another person the microorganisms, suspended in warm, moist droplets, may enter the body through the nose, mouth or eye surfaces.
- Fecal-oral transmission, wherein foodstuffs or water become contaminated (by people not washing their hands before preparing food, or untreated sewage being released into a drinking water supply) and the people who eat and drink them become infected. Common fecal-oral transmitted pathogens include Vibrio cholerae, Giardia species, rotaviruses, Entamoeba histolytica, Escherichia coli, and tape worms. Most of these pathogens cause gastroenteritis.
- Sexual transmission, with the result being called sexually transmitted infection.
- Oral transmission, diseases that are transmitted primarily by oral means may be caught through direct oral contact such as kissing, or by indirect contact such as by sharing a drinking glass or a cigarette.
- Transmission by direct contact, Some diseases that are transmissible by direct contact include athlete's foot, impetigo and warts.
- Vehicle transmission, transmission by an inanimate reservoir (food, water, soil).
- Vertical transmission, directly from the mother to an embryo, fetus or baby during pregnancy or childbirth. It can occur as a result of a pre-existing infection or one acquired during pregnancy.
- Iatrogenic transmission, due to medical procedures such as injection or transplantation of infected material.
- Vector-borne transmission, transmitted by a vector, which is an organism that does not cause disease itself but that transmits infection by conveying pathogens from one host to another.

The relationship between virulence versus transmissibility is complex; with studies showing no clear relationships between the two. There is still a small number of evidence that partially suggests a link between virulence and transmissibility.

== Diagnosis ==
Diagnosis of infectious disease sometimes involves identifying an infectious agent either directly or indirectly. In practice most minor infectious diseases such as warts, cutaneous abscesses, respiratory system infections and diarrheal diseases are diagnosed by their clinical presentation and treated without knowledge of the specific causative agent. Conclusions about the cause of the disease are based upon the likelihood that a patient came in contact with a particular agent, the presence of a microbe in a community, and other epidemiological considerations. Given sufficient effort, all known infectious agents can be specifically identified.

Diagnosis of infectious disease is nearly always initiated by medical history and physical examination. More detailed identification techniques involve the culture of infectious agents isolated from a patient. Culture allows identification of infectious organisms by examining their microscopic features, by detecting the presence of substances produced by pathogens, and by directly identifying an organism by its genotype.

Many infectious organisms are identified without culture and microscopy. This is especially true for viruses, which cannot grow in culture. For some suspected pathogens, doctors may conduct tests that examine a patient's blood or other body fluids for antigens or antibodies that indicate presence of a specific pathogen that the doctor suspects.

Other techniques (such as X-rays, CAT scans, PET scans or NMR) are used to produce images of internal abnormalities resulting from the growth of an infectious agent. The images are useful in detection of, for example, a bone abscess or a spongiform encephalopathy produced by a prion.

The benefits of identification, however, are often greatly outweighed by the cost, as often there is no specific treatment, the cause is obvious, or the outcome of an infection is likely to be benign.

=== Symptomatic ===
The diagnosis is aided by the presenting symptoms in any individual with an infectious disease, yet it usually needs additional diagnostic techniques to confirm the suspicion. Some signs are specifically characteristic and indicative of a disease and are called pathognomonic signs; but these are rare. Not all infections are symptomatic.

In children the presence of cyanosis, rapid breathing, poor peripheral perfusion, or a petechial rash increases the risk of a serious infection by greater than 5 fold. Other important indicators include parental concern, clinical instinct, and temperature greater than 40 °C.

=== Microbial culture ===
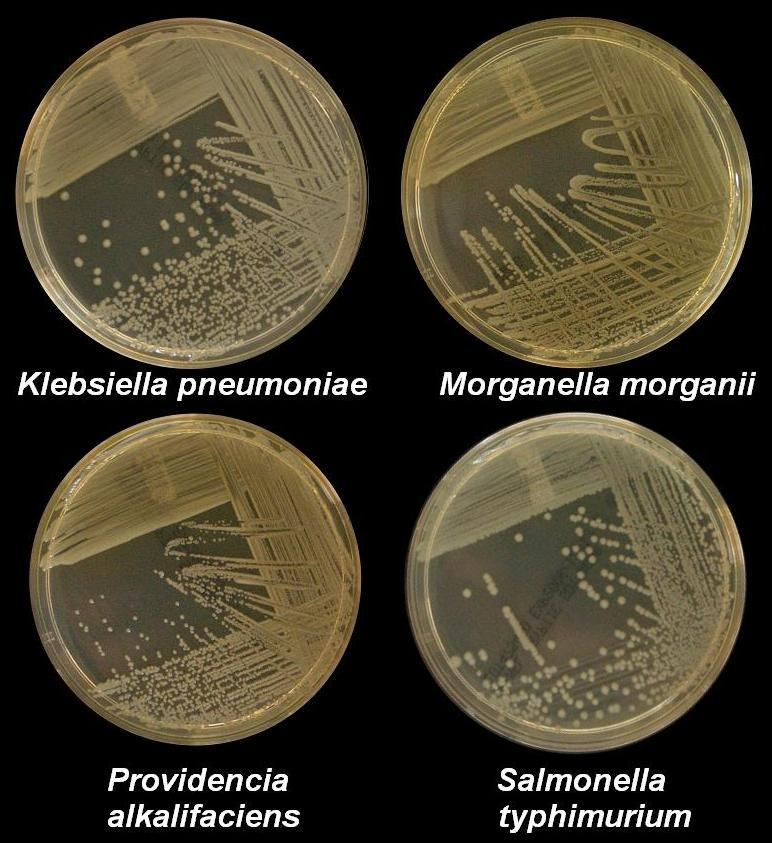
Four nutrient agar plates growing colonies of common Gram negative bacteria

Many diagnostic approaches depend on microbiological culture to isolate a pathogen from the appropriate clinical specimen. In a microbial culture, a growth medium is provided for a specific agent. A sample taken from potentially diseased tissue or fluid is then tested for the presence of an infectious agent able to grow within that medium. Many pathogenic bacteria are easily grown on nutrient agar, a form of solid medium that supplies carbohydrates and proteins necessary for growth, along with copious amounts of water. A single bacterium will grow into a visible mound on the surface of the plate called a colony, which may be separated from other colonies or melded together into a "lawn". The size, color, shape and form of a colony is characteristic of the bacterial species, its specific genetic makeup (its strain), and the environment that supports its growth. Other ingredients are often added to the plate to aid in identification. Plates may contain substances that permit the growth of some bacteria and not others, or that change color in response to certain bacteria and not others. Bacteriological plates such as these are commonly used in the clinical identification of infectious bacterium. Microbial culture may also be used in the identification of viruses: the medium, in this case, being cells grown in culture that the virus can infect, and then alter or kill. In the case of viral identification, a region of dead cells results from viral growth, and is called a "plaque". Eukaryotic parasites may also be grown in culture as a means of identifying a particular agent.

In the absence of suitable plate culture techniques, some microbes require culture within live animals. Bacteria such as Mycobacterium leprae and Treponema pallidum can be grown in animals, although serological and microscopic techniques make the use of live animals unnecessary. Viruses are also usually identified using alternatives to growth in culture or animals. Some viruses may be grown in embryonated eggs. Another useful identification method is Xenodiagnosis, or the use of a vector to support the growth of an infectious agent. Chagas disease is the most significant example, because it is difficult to directly demonstrate the presence of the causative agent, Trypanosoma cruzi in a patient, which therefore makes it difficult to definitively make a diagnosis. In this case, xenodiagnosis involves the use of the vector of the Chagas agent T. cruzi, an uninfected triatomine bug, which takes a blood meal from a person suspected of having been infected. The bug is later inspected for growth of T. cruzi within its gut.

=== Microscopy ===
Another principal tool in the diagnosis of infectious disease is microscopy. Virtually all of the culture techniques discussed above rely, at some point, on microscopic examination for definitive identification of the infectious agent. Microscopy may be carried out with simple instruments, such as the compound light microscope, or with instruments as complex as an electron microscope. Samples obtained from patients may be viewed directly under the light microscope, and can often rapidly lead to identification. Microscopy is often also used in conjunction with biochemical staining techniques, and can be made exquisitely specific when used in combination with antibody based techniques. For example, the use of antibodies made artificially fluorescent (fluorescently labeled antibodies) can be directed to bind to and identify a specific antigens present on a pathogen. A fluorescence microscope is then used to detect fluorescently labeled antibodies bound to internalized antigens within clinical samples or cultured cells. This technique is especially useful in the diagnosis of viral diseases, where the light microscope is incapable of identifying a virus directly.

Other microscopic procedures may also aid in identifying infectious agents. Almost all cells readily stain with a number of basic dyes due to the electrostatic attraction between negatively charged cellular molecules and the positive charge on the dye. A cell is normally transparent under a microscope, and using a stain increases the contrast of a cell with its background. Staining a cell with a dye such as Giemsa stain or crystal violet allows a microscopist to describe its size, shape, internal and external components and its associations with other cells. The response of bacteria to different staining procedures is used in the taxonomic classification of microbes as well. Two methods, the Gram stain and the acid-fast stain, are the standard approaches used to classify bacteria and to diagnosis of disease. The Gram stain identifies the bacterial groups Bacillota and Actinomycetota, both of which contain many significant human pathogens. The acid-fast staining procedure identifies the Actinomycetota genera Mycobacterium and Nocardia.

=== Biochemical tests ===
Biochemical tests used in the identification of infectious agents include the detection of metabolic or enzymatic products characteristic of a particular infectious agent. Since bacteria ferment carbohydrates in patterns characteristic of their genus and species, the detection of fermentation products is commonly used in bacterial identification. Acids, alcohols and gases are usually detected in these tests when bacteria are grown in selective liquid or solid media.

The isolation of enzymes from infected tissue can also provide the basis of a biochemical diagnosis of an infectious disease. For example, humans can make neither RNA replicases nor reverse transcriptase, and the presence of these enzymes are characteristic., of specific types of viral infections. The ability of the viral protein hemagglutinin to bind red blood cells together into a detectable matrix may also be characterized as a biochemical test for viral infection, although strictly speaking hemagglutinin is not an enzyme and has no metabolic function.

Serological methods are highly sensitive, specific and often extremely rapid tests used to identify microorganisms. These tests are based upon the ability of an antibody to bind specifically to an antigen. The antigen, usually a protein or carbohydrate made by an infectious agent, is bound by the antibody. This binding then sets off a chain of events that can be visibly obvious in various ways, dependent upon the test. For example, "Strep throat" is often diagnosed within minutes, and is based on the appearance of antigens made by the causative agent, S. pyogenes, that is retrieved from a patient's throat with a cotton swab. Serological tests, if available, are usually the preferred route of identification, however the tests are costly to develop and the reagents used in the test often require refrigeration. Some serological methods are extremely costly, although when commonly used, such as with the "strep test", they can be inexpensive.

Complex serological techniques have been developed into what are known as immunoassays. Immunoassays can use the basic antibody – antigen binding as the basis to produce an electro-magnetic or particle radiation signal, which can be detected by some form of instrumentation. Signal of unknowns can be compared to that of standards allowing quantitation of the target antigen. To aid in the diagnosis of infectious diseases, immunoassays can detect or measure antigens from either infectious agents or proteins generated by an infected organism in response to a foreign agent. For example, immunoassay A may detect the presence of a surface protein from a virus particle. Immunoassay B on the other hand may detect or measure antibodies produced by an organism's immune system that are made to neutralize and allow the destruction of the virus.

Instrumentation can be used to read extremely small signals created by secondary reactions linked to the antibody – antigen binding. Instrumentation can control sampling, reagent use, reaction times, signal detection, calculation of results, and data management to yield a cost-effective automated process for diagnosis of infectious disease.

=== PCR-based diagnostics ===
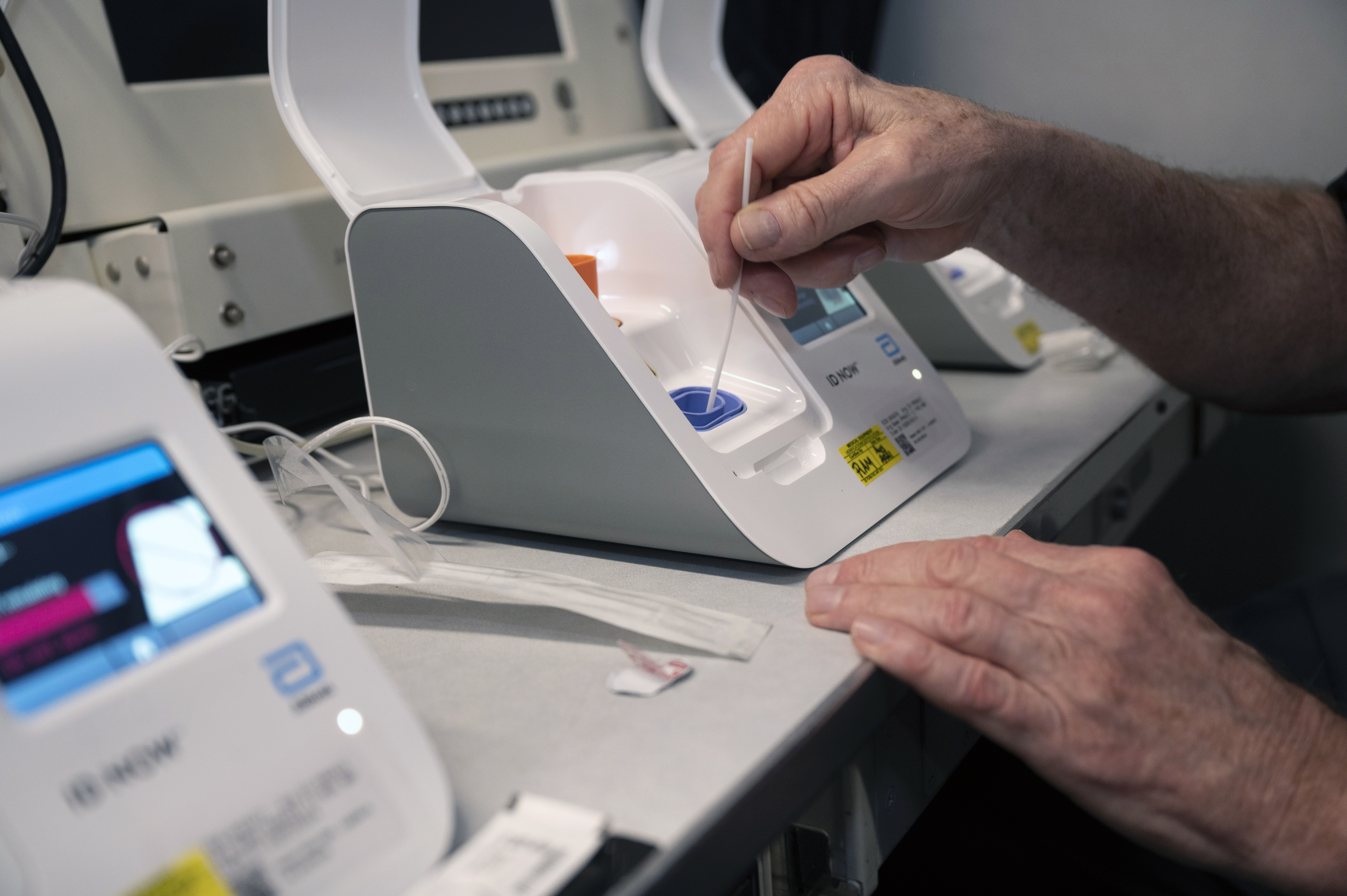
Nucleic acid testing conducted using an Abbott Laboratories ID Now device

Technologies based upon the polymerase chain reaction (PCR) method will become nearly ubiquitous gold standards of diagnostics of the near future, for several reasons. First, the catalog of infectious agents has grown to the point that virtually all of the significant infectious agents of the human population have been identified. Second, an infectious agent must grow within the human body to cause disease; essentially it must amplify its own nucleic acids to cause a disease. This amplification of nucleic acid in infected tissue offers an opportunity to detect the infectious agent by using PCR. Third, the essential tools for directing PCR, primers, are derived from the genomes of infectious agents, and with time those genomes will be known if they are not already.

Thus, the technological ability to detect any infectious agent rapidly and specifically is currently available. The only remaining blockades to the use of PCR as a standard tool of diagnosis are in its cost and application, neither of which is insurmountable. The diagnosis of a few diseases will not benefit from the development of PCR methods, such as some of the clostridial diseases (tetanus and botulism). These diseases are fundamentally biological poisonings by relatively small numbers of infectious bacteria that produce extremely potent neurotoxins. A significant proliferation of the infectious agent does not occur, this limits the ability of PCR to detect the presence of any bacteria.

=== Metagenomic sequencing ===
Given the wide range of bacterial, viral, fungal, protozoal, and helminthic pathogens that cause debilitating and life-threatening illnesses, the ability to quickly identify the cause of infection is important yet often challenging. For example, more than half of cases of encephalitis, a severe illness affecting the brain, remain undiagnosed, despite extensive testing using the standard of care (microbiological culture) and state-of-the-art clinical laboratory methods. Metagenomic sequencing-based diagnostic tests are currently being developed for clinical use and show promise as a sensitive, specific, and rapid way to diagnose infection using a single all-encompassing test. This test is similar to current PCR tests; however, an untargeted whole genome amplification is used rather than primers for a specific infectious agent. This amplification step is followed by next-generation sequencing or third-generation sequencing, alignment comparisons, and taxonomic classification using large databases of thousands of pathogen and commensal reference genomes. Simultaneously, antimicrobial resistance genes within pathogen and plasmid genomes are sequenced and aligned to the taxonomically classified pathogen genomes to generate an antimicrobial resistance profile – analogous to antibiotic sensitivity testing – to facilitate antimicrobial stewardship and allow for the optimization of treatment using the most effective drugs for a patient's infection.

Metagenomic sequencing could prove especially useful for diagnosis when the patient is immunocompromised. An ever-wider array of infectious agents can cause serious harm to individuals with immunosuppression, so clinical screening must often be broader. Additionally, the expression of symptoms is often atypical, making a clinical diagnosis based on presentation more difficult. Thirdly, diagnostic methods that rely on the detection of antibodies are more likely to fail. A rapid, sensitive, specific, and untargeted test for all known human pathogens that detects the presence of the organism's DNA rather than antibodies is therefore highly desirable.

=== Indication of tests ===
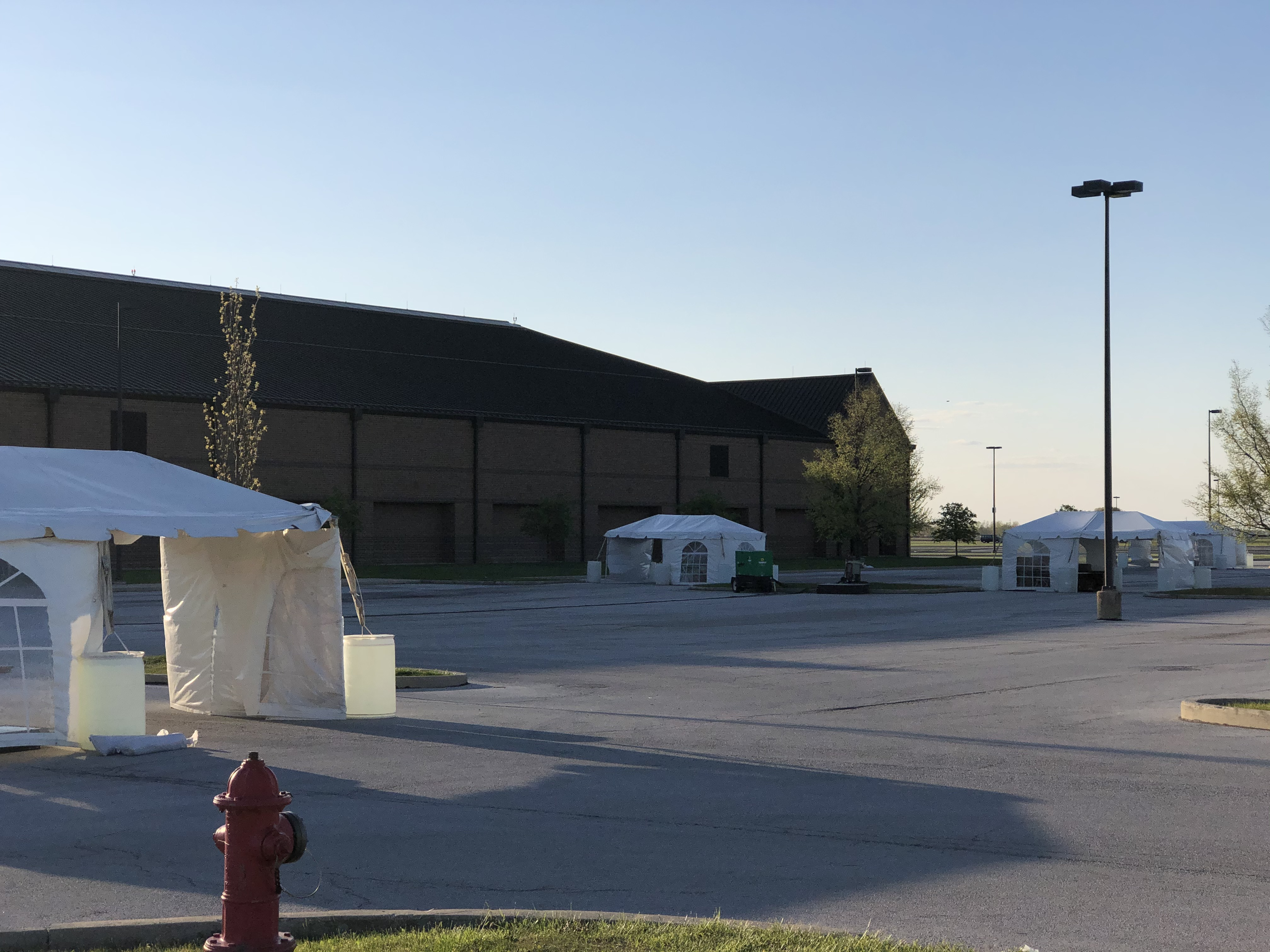
A temporary drive-in testing site for COVID-19 set up with tents in a parking lot

There is usually an indication for a specific identification of an infectious agent only when such identification can aid in the treatment or prevention of the disease, or to advance knowledge of the course of an illness prior to the development of effective therapeutic or preventative measures. For example, in the early 1980s, prior to the appearance of AZT for the treatment of AIDS, the course of the disease was closely followed by monitoring the composition of patient blood samples, even though the outcome would not offer the patient any further treatment options. In part, these studies on the appearance of HIV in specific communities permitted the advancement of hypotheses as to the route of transmission of the virus. By understanding how the disease was transmitted, resources could be targeted to the communities at greatest risk in campaigns aimed at reducing the number of new infections. The specific serological diagnostic identification, and later genotypic or molecular identification, of HIV also enabled the development of hypotheses as to the temporal and geographical origins of the virus, as well as a myriad of other hypothesis. The development of molecular diagnostic tools have enabled physicians and researchers to monitor the efficacy of treatment with anti-retroviral drugs. Molecular diagnostics are now commonly used to identify HIV in healthy people long before the onset of illness and have been used to demonstrate the existence of people who are genetically resistant to HIV infection. Thus, while there still is no cure for AIDS, there is great therapeutic and predictive benefit to identifying the virus and monitoring the virus levels within the blood of infected individuals, both for the patient and for the community at large.

=== Classification ===
==== Subclinical versus clinical (latent versus apparent) ====
Symptomatic infections are apparent and clinical, whereas an infection that is active but does not produce noticeable symptoms may be called inapparent, silent, subclinical, or occult. An infection that is inactive or dormant is called a latent infection. An example of a latent bacterial infection is latent tuberculosis. Some viral infections can also be latent, examples of latent viral infections are any of those from the Herpesviridae family.

The word infection can denote any presence of a particular pathogen at all (no matter how little) but also is often used in a sense implying a clinically apparent infection (in other words, a case of infectious disease). This fact occasionally creates some ambiguity or prompts some usage discussion; to get around this it is common for health professionals to speak of colonization (rather than infection) when they mean that some of the pathogens are present but that no clinically apparent infection (no disease) is present.

==== Course of infection ====
Different terms are used to describe how and where infections present over time. In an acute infection, symptoms develop rapidly; its course can either be rapid or protracted. In chronic infection, symptoms usually develop gradually over weeks or months and are slow to resolve. In subacute infections, symptoms take longer to develop than in acute infections but arise more quickly than those of chronic infections. A focal infection is an initial site of infection from which organisms travel via the bloodstream to another area of the body.

==== Primary versus opportunistic ====
Among the many varieties of microorganisms, relatively few cause disease in otherwise healthy individuals. Infectious disease results from the interplay between those few pathogens and the defenses of the hosts they infect. The appearance and severity of disease resulting from any pathogen depend upon the ability of that pathogen to damage the host as well as the ability of the host to resist the pathogen. However, a host's immune system can also cause damage to the host itself in an attempt to control the infection. Clinicians, therefore, classify infectious microorganisms or microbes according to the status of host defenses – either as primary pathogens or as opportunistic pathogens.

===== Primary pathogens =====
Primary pathogens cause disease as a result of their presence or activity within the normal, healthy host, and their intrinsic virulence (the severity of the disease they cause) is, in part, a necessary consequence of their need to reproduce and spread. Many of the most common primary pathogens of humans only infect humans, however, many serious diseases are caused by organisms acquired from the environment or that infect non-human hosts.

===== Opportunistic pathogens =====
Opportunistic pathogens can cause an infectious disease in a host with depressed resistance (immunodeficiency) or if they have unusual access to the inside of the body (for example, via trauma). Opportunistic infection may be caused by microbes ordinarily in contact with the host, such as pathogenic bacteria or fungi in the gastrointestinal or the upper respiratory tract, and they may also result from (otherwise innocuous) microbes acquired from other hosts (as in Clostridioides difficile colitis) or from the environment as a result of traumatic introduction (as in surgical wound infections or compound fractures). An opportunistic disease requires impairment of host defenses, which may occur as a result of genetic defects (such as chronic granulomatous disease), exposure to antimicrobial drugs or immunosuppressive chemicals (as might occur following poisoning or cancer chemotherapy), exposure to ionizing radiation, or as a result of an infectious disease with immunosuppressive activity (such as with measles, malaria or HIV disease). Primary pathogens may also cause more severe disease in a host with depressed resistance than would normally occur in an immunosufficient host.

===== Secondary infection =====
While a primary infection can practically be viewed as the root cause of an individual's current health problem, a secondary infection is a sequela or complication of that root cause. For example, an infection due to a burn or penetrating trauma (the root cause) is a secondary infection. Primary pathogens often cause primary infection and often cause secondary infection. Usually, opportunistic infections are viewed as secondary infections (because immunodeficiency or injury was the predisposing factor).

===== Other types of infection =====
Other types of infection consist of mixed, iatrogenic, nosocomial, and community-acquired infection. A mixed infection is an infection that is caused by two or more pathogens. An example of this is appendicitis, which is caused by Bacteroides fragilis and Escherichia coli. The second is an iatrogenic infection. This type of infection is one that is transmitted from a health care worker to a patient. A nosocomial infection is also one that occurs in a health care setting. Nosocomial infections are those that are acquired during a hospital stay. Lastly, a community-acquired infection is one in which the infection is acquired from a whole community.

==== Infectious or not ====
One manner of proving that a given disease is infectious, is to satisfy Koch's postulates (first proposed by Robert Koch), which require that first, the infectious agent be identifiable only in patients who have the disease, and not in healthy controls, and second, that patients who contract the infectious agent also develop the disease. These postulates were first used in the discovery that Mycobacteria species cause tuberculosis.

However, Koch's postulates cannot usually be tested in modern practice for ethical reasons. Proving them would require experimental infection of a healthy individual with a pathogen produced as a pure culture. Conversely, even clearly infectious diseases do not always meet the infectious criteria; for example, Treponema pallidum, the causative spirochete of syphilis, cannot be cultured in vitro – however the organism can be cultured in rabbit testes. It is less clear that a pure culture comes from an animal source serving as host than it is when derived from microbes derived from plate culture.

Epidemiology, or the study and analysis of who, why and where disease occurs, and what determines whether various populations have a disease, is another important tool used to understand infectious disease. Epidemiologists may determine differences among groups within a population, such as whether certain age groups have a greater or lesser rate of infection; whether groups living in different neighborhoods are more likely to be infected; and by other factors, such as gender and race. Researchers also may assess whether a disease outbreak is sporadic, or just an occasional occurrence; endemic, with a steady level of regular cases occurring in a region; epidemic, with a fast arising, and unusually high number of cases in a region; or pandemic, which is a global epidemic. If the cause of the infectious disease is unknown, epidemiology can be used to assist with tracking down the sources of infection.

==== Contagiousness ====
Infectious diseases are sometimes called contagious diseases when they are easily transmitted by contact with an ill person or their secretions (e.g., influenza). Thus, a contagious disease is a subset of infectious disease that is especially infective or easily transmitted. All contagious diseases are infectious, but not vice versa. Other types of infectious, transmissible, or communicable diseases with more specialized routes of infection, such as vector transmission or sexual transmission, are usually not regarded as "contagious", and often do not require medical isolation (sometimes loosely called quarantine) of those affected. However, this specialized connotation of the word "contagious" and "contagious disease" (easy transmissibility) is not always respected in popular use.

Infectious diseases are commonly transmitted from person to person through direct contact. The types of direct contact are through person to person and droplet spread. Indirect contact such as airborne transmission, contaminated objects, food and drinking water, animal person contact, animal reservoirs, insect bites, and environmental reservoirs are another way infectious diseases are transmitted. The basic reproduction number of an infectious disease measures how easily it spreads through direct or indirect contact.

==== By anatomic location ====
Infections can be classified by the anatomic location or organ system infected, including:

- Urinary tract infection
- Skin infection
- Respiratory tract infection
- Odontogenic infection (an infection that originates within a tooth or in the closely surrounding tissues)
- Vaginal infections
- Intra-amniotic infection

In addition, locations of inflammation where infection is the most common cause include pneumonia, meningitis and salpingitis.

== Prevention ==
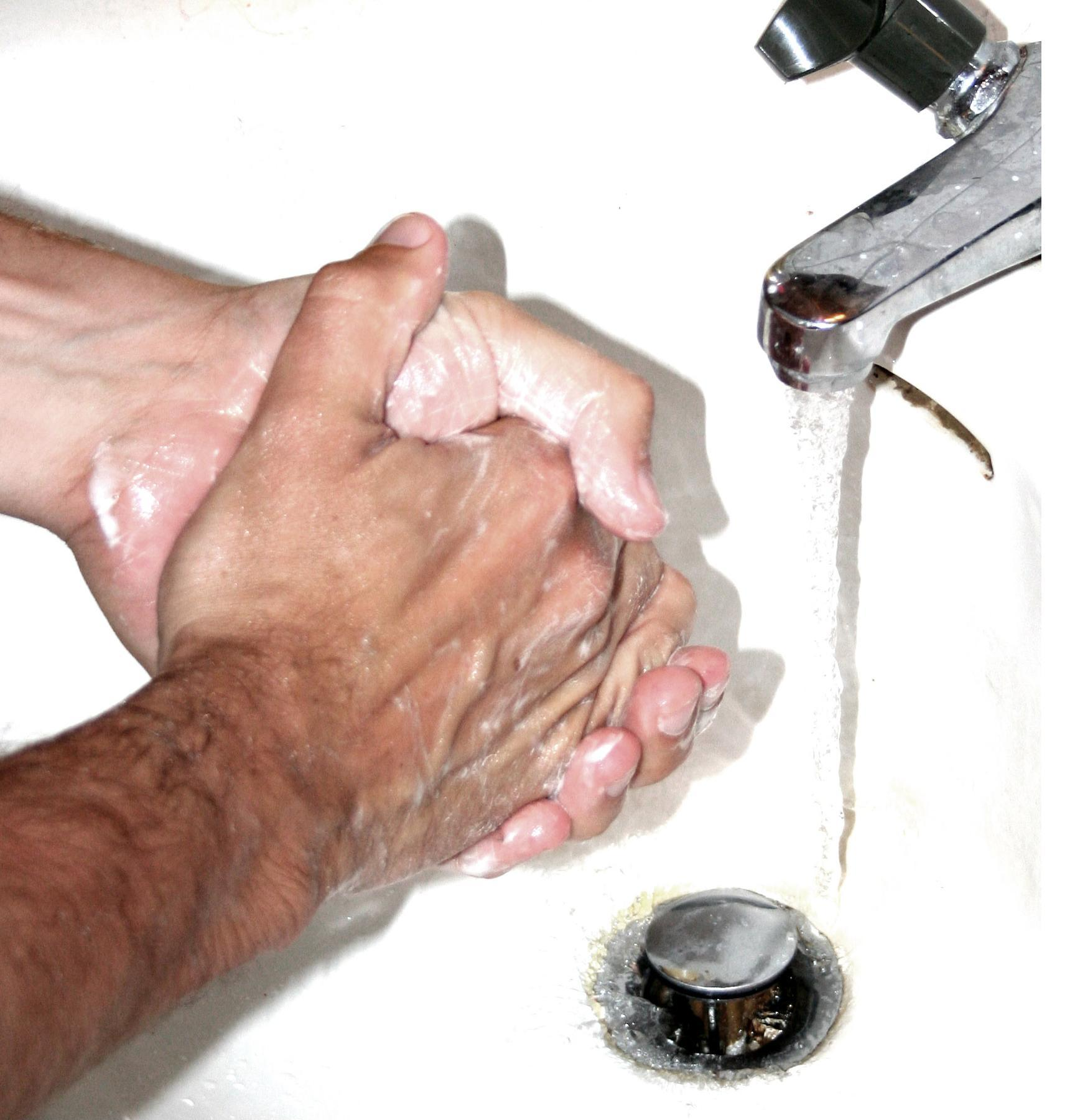
Washing one's hands, a form of hygiene, is an effective way to prevent the spread of infectious disease.

Techniques like hand washing, wearing gowns, and wearing face masks can help prevent infections from being passed from one person to another. Aseptic technique was introduced in medicine and surgery in the late 19th century and greatly reduced the incidence of infections caused by surgery. Frequent hand washing remains the most important defense against the spread of unwanted organisms. There are other forms of prevention such as avoiding the use of illicit drugs, using a condom, wearing gloves, and having a healthy lifestyle with a balanced diet and regular exercise. Cooking foods well and avoiding foods that have been left outside for a long time is also important.

Antimicrobial substances used to prevent transmission of infections include:

- antiseptics, which are applied to living tissue/skin
- disinfectants, which destroy microorganisms found on non-living objects.
- antibiotics, called prophylactic when given as prevention rather as treatment of infection. However, long term use of antibiotics leads to resistance of bacteria. While humans do not become immune to antibiotics, the bacteria does. Thus, avoiding using antibiotics longer than necessary helps preventing bacteria from forming mutations that aide in antibiotic resistance.

One of the ways to prevent or slow down the transmission of infectious diseases is to recognize the different characteristics of various diseases. Some critical disease characteristics that should be evaluated include virulence, distance traveled by those affected, and level of contagiousness. The human strains of Ebola virus, for example, incapacitate those infected extremely quickly and kill them soon after. As a result, those affected by this disease do not have the opportunity to travel very far from the initial infection zone. Also, this virus must spread through skin lesions or permeable membranes such as the eye. Thus, the initial stage of Ebola is not very contagious since its victims experience only internal hemorrhaging. As a result of the above features, the spread of Ebola is very rapid and usually stays within a relatively confined geographical area. In contrast, the human immunodeficiency virus (HIV) kills its victims very slowly by attacking their immune system. As a result, many of its victims transmit the virus to other individuals before even realizing that they are carrying the disease. Also, the relatively low virulence allows its victims to travel long distances, increasing the likelihood of an epidemic.

Another effective way to decrease the transmission rate of infectious diseases is to recognize the effects of small-world networks. In epidemics, there are often extensive interactions within hubs or groups of infected individuals and other interactions within discrete hubs of susceptible individuals. Despite the low interaction between discrete hubs, the disease can jump and spread in a susceptible hub via a single or few interactions with an infected hub. Thus, infection rates in small-world networks can be reduced somewhat if interactions between individuals within infected hubs are eliminated (Figure 1). However, infection rates can be drastically reduced if the main focus is on the prevention of transmission jumps between hubs. The use of needle exchange programs in areas with a high density of drug users with HIV is an example of the successful implementation of this treatment method. Another example is the use of ring culling or vaccination of potentially susceptible livestock in adjacent farms to prevent the spread of the foot-and-mouth virus in 2001.

A general method to prevent transmission of vector-borne pathogens is pest control.

In cases where infection is merely suspected, individuals may be quarantined until the incubation period has passed and the disease manifests itself or the person remains healthy. Groups may undergo quarantine, or in the case of communities, a cordon sanitaire may be imposed to prevent infection from spreading beyond the community, or in the case of protective sequestration, into a community. Public health authorities may implement other forms of social distancing, such as school closings, lockdowns or temporary restrictions (e.g. circuit breakers) to control an epidemic.

=== Immunity ===
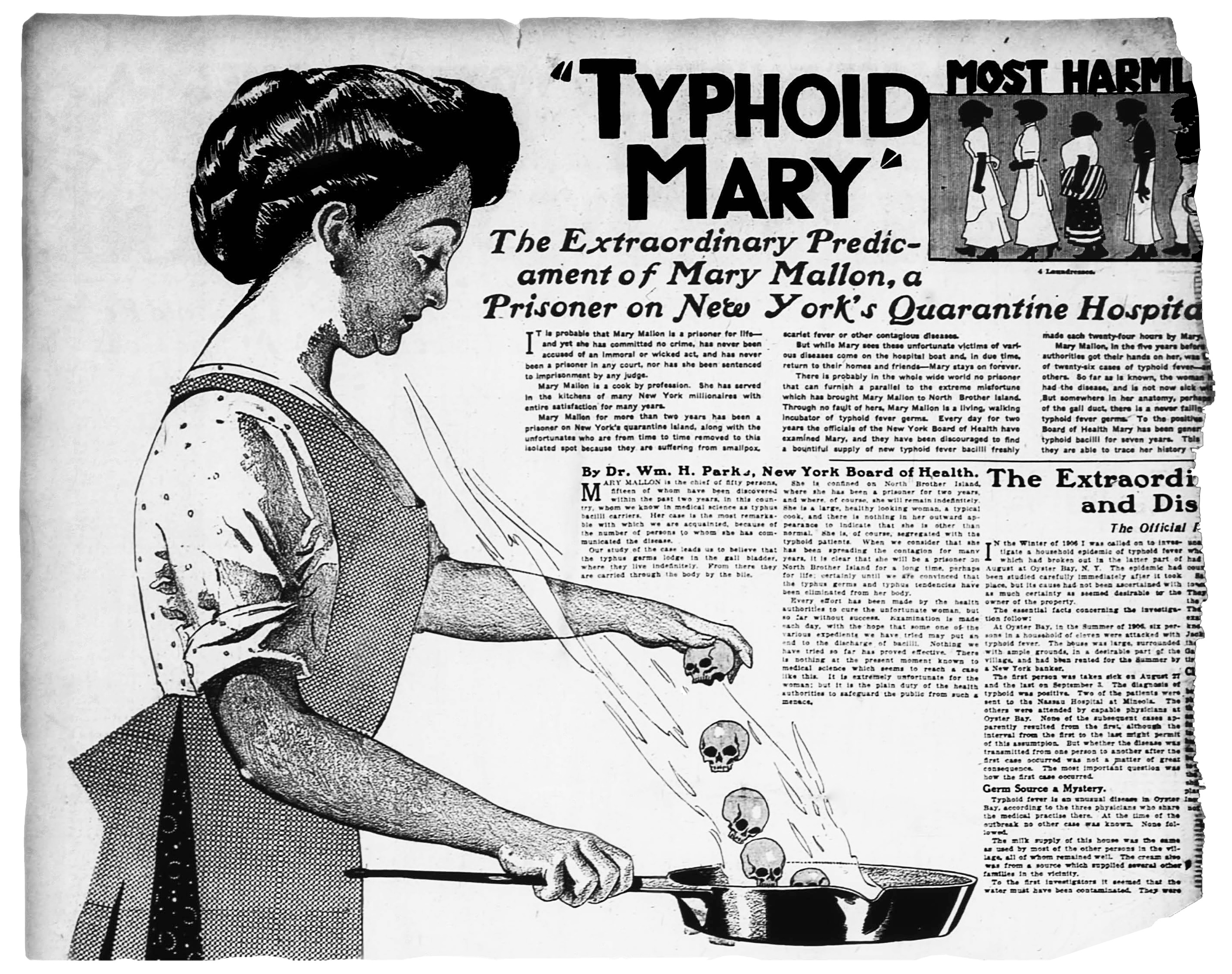
Mary Mallon (a.k.a. Typhoid Mary) was an asymptomatic carrier of typhoid fever. Over the course of her career as a cook, she infected 53 people, three of whom died.

Infection with most pathogens does not result in death of the host and the offending organism is ultimately cleared after the symptoms of the disease have waned. This process requires immune mechanisms to kill or inactivate the inoculum of the pathogen. Specific acquired immunity against infectious diseases may be mediated by antibodies and/or T lymphocytes. Immunity mediated by these two factors may be manifested by:

- a direct effect upon a pathogen, such as antibody-initiated complement-dependent bacteriolysis, opsonoization, phagocytosis and killing, as occurs for some bacteria,
- neutralization of viruses so that these organisms cannot enter cells,
- or by T lymphocytes, which will kill a cell parasitized by a microorganism.

The immune system response to a microorganism often causes symptoms such as a high fever and inflammation, and has the potential to be more devastating than direct damage caused by a microbe.

Resistance to infection (immunity) may be acquired following a disease, by asymptomatic carriage of the pathogen, by harboring an organism with a similar structure (crossreacting), or by vaccination. Knowledge of the protective antigens and specific acquired host immune factors is more complete for primary pathogens than for opportunistic pathogens. There is also the phenomenon of herd immunity which offers a measure of protection to those otherwise vulnerable people when a large enough proportion of the population has acquired immunity from certain infections.

Immune resistance to an infectious disease requires a critical level of either antigen-specific antibodies and/or T cells when the host encounters the pathogen. Some individuals develop natural serum antibodies to the surface polysaccharides of some agents although they have had little or no contact with the agent, these natural antibodies confer specific protection to adults and are passively transmitted to newborns.

==== Host genetic factors ====
The organism that is the target of an infecting action of a specific infectious agent is called the host. The host harbouring an agent that is in a mature or sexually active stage phase is called the definitive host. The intermediate host comes in contact during the larvae stage. A host can be anything living and can attain to asexual and sexual reproduction. The clearance of the pathogens, either treatment-induced or spontaneous, it can be influenced by the genetic variants carried by the individual patients. For instance, for genotype 1 hepatitis C treated with Pegylated interferon-alpha-2a or Pegylated interferon-alpha-2b (brand names Pegasys or PEG-Intron) combined with ribavirin, it has been shown that genetic polymorphisms near the human IL28B gene, encoding interferon lambda 3, are associated with significant differences in the treatment-induced clearance of the virus. This finding, originally reported in Nature, showed that genotype 1 hepatitis C patients carrying certain genetic variant alleles near the IL28B gene are more possibly to achieve sustained virological response after the treatment than others. Later report from Nature demonstrated that the same genetic variants are also associated with the natural clearance of the genotype 1 hepatitis C virus.

== Treatments ==
When infection attacks the body, anti-infective drugs can suppress the infection. Several broad types of anti-infective drugs exist, depending on the type of organism targeted; they include antibacterial (antibiotic; including antitubercular), antiviral, antifungal and antiparasitic (including antiprotozoal and antihelminthic) agents. Depending on the severity and the type of infection, the antibiotic may be given by mouth or by injection, or may be applied topically. Severe infections of the brain are usually treated with intravenous antibiotics. Sometimes, multiple antibiotics are used in case there is resistance to one antibiotic. Antibiotics only work for bacteria and do not affect viruses. Antibiotics work by slowing down the multiplication of bacteria or killing the bacteria. The most common classes of antibiotics used in medicine include penicillin, cephalosporins, aminoglycosides, macrolides, quinolones and tetracyclines.

Not all infections require treatment, and for many self-limiting infections the treatment may cause more side-effects than benefits. Antimicrobial stewardship is the concept that healthcare providers should treat an infection with an antimicrobial that specifically works well for the target pathogen for the shortest amount of time and to only treat when there is a known or highly suspected pathogen that will respond to the medication.

== Susceptibility to infection ==
Pandemics such as COVID-19 show that people dramatically differ in their susceptibility to infection. This may be because of general health, age, or their immune status, e.g. when they have been infected previously. However, it also has become clear that there are genetic factors which determine susceptibility to infection. For instance, up to 40% of SARS-CoV-2 infections may be asymptomatic, suggesting that many people are naturally protected from disease. Large genetic studies have defined risk factors for severe SARS-CoV-2 infections, and genome sequences from 659 patients with severe COVID-19 revealed genetic variants that appear to be associated with life-threatening disease. One gene identified in these studies is type I interferon (IFN). Autoantibodies against type I IFNs were found in up to 13.7% of patients with life-threatening COVID-19, indicating that a complex interaction between genetics and the immune system is important for natural resistance to Covid.

Similarly, mutations in the ERAP2 gene, encoding endoplasmic reticulum aminopeptidase 2, seem to increase the susceptibility to the plague, the disease caused by an infection with the bacteria Yersinia pestis. People who inherited two copies of a complete variant of the gene were twice as likely to have survived the plague as those who inherited two copies of a truncated variant.

Susceptibility also determined the epidemiology of infection, given that different populations have different genetic and environmental conditions that affect infections.

== Epidemiology ==
Death rate from infectious diseases Map

An estimated 1,680 million people died of infectious diseases in the 20th century and about 10 million in 2010.

The World Health Organization collects information on global deaths by International Classification of Disease (ICD) code categories. The following table lists the top infectious disease by number of deaths in 2002. 1993 data is included for comparison.

Worldwide mortality due to infectious diseases
| Rank | Cause of death | Deaths 2002 (in millions) | Percentage of all deaths | Deaths 1993 (in millions) | 1993 Rank |
|---|---|---|---|---|---|
| N/A | All infectious diseases | 14.7 | 25.9% | 16.4 | 32.2% |
| 1 | Lower respiratory infections | 3.9 | 6.9% | 4.1 | 1 |
| 2 | HIV/AIDS | 2.8 | 4.9% | 0.7 | 7 |
| 3 | Diarrheal diseases | 1.8 | 3.2% | 3.0 | 2 |
| 4 | Tuberculosis (TB) | 1.6 | 2.7% | 2.7 | 3 |
| 5 | Malaria | 1.3 | 2.2% | 2.0 | 4 |
| 6 | Measles | 0.6 | 1.1% | 1.1 | 5 |
| 7 | Pertussis | 0.29 | 0.5% | 0.36 | 7 |
| 8 | Tetanus | 0.21 | 0.4% | 0.15 | 12 |
| 9 | Meningitis | 0.17 | 0.3% | 0.25 | 8 |
| 10 | Syphilis | 0.16 | 0.3% | 0.19 | 11 |
| 11 | Hepatitis B | 0.10 | 0.2% | 0.93 | 6 |
| 12–17 | Tropical diseases (6) | 0.13 | 0.2% | 0.53 | 9, 10, 16–18 |
Note: Other causes of death include maternal and perinatal conditions (5.2%), nutritional deficiencies (0.9%), noncommunicable conditions (58.8%), and injuries (9.1%).

The top three single agent/disease killers are HIV/AIDS, TB and malaria. While the number of deaths due to nearly every disease have decreased, deaths due to HIV/AIDS have increased fourfold. Childhood diseases include pertussis, poliomyelitis, diphtheria, measles and tetanus. Children also make up a large percentage of lower respiratory and diarrheal deaths. In 2012, approximately 3.1 million people have died due to lower respiratory infections, making it the number 4 leading cause of death in the world.

=== Historic pandemics ===
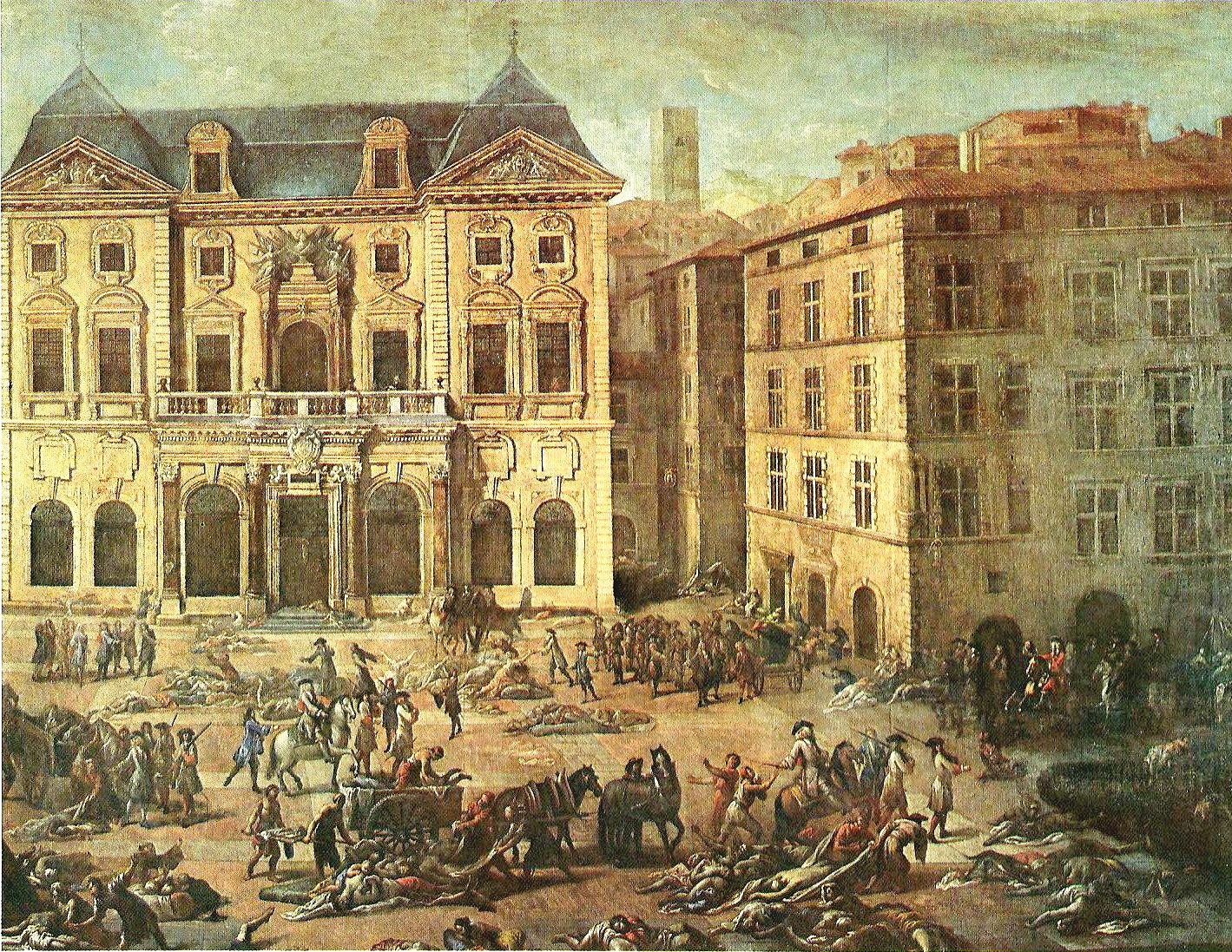
The Great Plague of Marseille in 1720 killed 100,000 people in the city and the surrounding provinces.

With their potential for unpredictable and explosive impacts, infectious diseases have been major actors in human history. A pandemic (or global epidemic) is a disease that affects people over an extensive geographical area. For example:

- Plague of Justinian, from 541 to 542, killed between 50% and 60% of Europe's population.
- The Black Death of 1347 to 1352 killed 25 million in Europe over five years. The plague reduced the old world population from an estimated 450 million to between 350 and 375 million in the 14th century.
- The introduction of smallpox, measles, and typhus to the areas of Central and South America by European explorers during the 15th and 16th centuries caused pandemics among the native inhabitants. Between 1518 and 1568 disease pandemics are said to have caused the population of Mexico to fall from 20 million to 3 million.
- The first European influenza epidemic occurred between 1556 and 1560, with an estimated mortality rate of 20%.
- Smallpox killed an estimated 60 million Europeans during the 18th century (approximately 400,000 per year). Up to 30% of those infected, including 80% of the children under 5 years of age, died from the disease, and one-third of the survivors went blind.
- In the 19th century, tuberculosis killed an estimated one-quarter of the adult population of Europe; by 1918 one in six deaths in France were still caused by TB.
- The Influenza Pandemic of 1918 (or the Spanish flu) killed 25–50 million people (about 2% of world population of 1.7 billion). Today Influenza kills about 250,000 to 500,000 worldwide each year.
- In 2021, COVID-19 emerged as a major global health crisis, directly causing 8.7 million deaths, making it one of the leading causes of mortality worldwide.

=== Emerging diseases ===
In most cases, microorganisms live in harmony with their hosts via mutual or commensal interactions. Diseases can emerge when existing parasites become pathogenic or when new pathogenic parasites enter a new host.

1. Coevolution between parasite and host can lead to hosts becoming resistant to the parasites or the parasites may evolve greater virulence, leading to immunopathological disease.
2. Human activity is involved with many emerging infectious diseases, such as environmental change enabling a parasite to occupy new niches. When that happens, a pathogen that had been confined to a remote habitat has a wider distribution and possibly a new host organism. Parasites jumping from nonhuman to human hosts are known as zoonoses. Under disease invasion, when a parasite invades a new host species, it may become pathogenic in the new host.

Several human activities have led to the emergence of zoonotic human pathogens, including viruses, bacteria, protozoa, and rickettsia, and spread of vector-borne diseases, see also globalization and disease and wildlife disease:

- Encroachment on wildlife habitats. The construction of new villages and housing developments in rural areas force animals to live in dense populations, creating opportunities for microbes to mutate and emerge.
- Changes in agriculture. The introduction of new crops attracts new crop pests and the microbes they carry to farming communities, exposing people to unfamiliar diseases.
- The destruction of rain forests. As countries make use of their rain forests, by building roads through forests and clearing areas for settlement or commercial ventures, people encounter insects and other animals harboring previously unknown microorganisms.
- Uncontrolled urbanization. The rapid growth of cities in many developing countries tends to concentrate large numbers of people into crowded areas with poor sanitation. These conditions foster transmission of contagious diseases.
- Modern transport. Ships and other cargo carriers often harbor unintended "passengers", that can spread diseases to faraway destinations. While with international jet-airplane travel, people infected with a disease can carry it to distant lands, or home to their families, before their first symptoms appear.

== History ==
In Antiquity, the Greek historian Thucydides (c. 460 – c. 400 BCE) was the first person to write, in his account of the plague of Athens, that diseases could spread from an infected person to others. In his On the Different Types of Fever (c. 175 AD), the Greco-Roman physician Galen speculated that plagues were spread by "certain seeds of plague", which were present in the air. In the Sushruta Samhita, the ancient Indian physician Sushruta theorized: "Leprosy, fever, consumption, diseases of the eye, and other infectious diseases spread from one person to another by sexual union, physical contact, eating together, sleeping together, sitting together, and the use of same clothes, garlands and pastes." This book has been dated to about the sixth century BC.

A basic form of contagion theory was proposed by Persian physician Ibn Sina (known as Avicenna in Europe) in The Canon of Medicine (1025), which later became the most authoritative medical textbook in Europe up until the 16th century. In Book IV of the Canon, Ibn Sina discussed epidemics, outlining the classical miasma theory and attempting to blend it with his own early contagion theory. He mentioned that people can transmit disease to others by breath, noted contagion with tuberculosis, and discussed the transmission of disease through water and dirt. The concept of invisible contagion was later discussed by several Islamic scholars in the Ayyubid Sultanate who referred to them as najasat ("impure substances"). The fiqh scholar Ibn al-Haj al-Abdari (c. 1250–1336), while discussing Islamic diet and hygiene, gave warnings about how contagion can contaminate water, food, and garments, and could spread through the water supply, and may have implied contagion to be unseen particles.

When the Black Death bubonic plague reached Al-Andalus in the 14th century, the Arab physicians Ibn Khatima (c. 1369) and Ibn al-Khatib (1313–1374) hypothesised that infectious diseases were caused by "minute bodies" and described how they can be transmitted through garments, vessels and earrings. Ideas of contagion became more popular in Europe during the Renaissance, particularly through the writing of the Italian physician Girolamo Fracastoro. Anton van Leeuwenhoek (1632–1723) advanced the science of microscopy by being the first to observe microorganisms, allowing for easy visualization of bacteria.

In the mid-19th century John Snow and William Budd did important work demonstrating the contagiousness of typhoid and cholera through contaminated water. Both are credited with decreasing epidemics of cholera in their towns by implementing measures to prevent contamination of water. Louis Pasteur proved beyond doubt that certain diseases are caused by infectious agents, and developed a vaccine for rabies. Robert Koch provided the study of infectious diseases with a scientific basis known as Koch's postulates. Edward Jenner, Jonas Salk and Albert Sabin developed effective vaccines for smallpox and polio, which would later result in the eradication and near-eradication of these diseases, respectively. Alexander Fleming discovered the world's first antibiotic, penicillin, which Florey and Chain then developed. Gerhard Domagk developed sulphonamides, the first broad spectrum synthetic antibacterial drugs.

=== Medical specialists ===
The medical treatment of infectious diseases falls into the medical field of Infectious Disease and in some cases the study of propagation pertains to the field of Epidemiology. Generally, infections are initially diagnosed by primary care physicians or internal medicine specialists. For example, an "uncomplicated" pneumonia will generally be treated by the internist or the pulmonologist (lung physician). The work of the infectious diseases specialist therefore entails working with both patients and general practitioners, as well as laboratory scientists, immunologists, bacteriologists and other specialists.

An infectious disease team may be alerted when:

- The disease has not been definitively diagnosed after an initial workup
- The patient is immunocompromised (for example, in AIDS or after chemotherapy);
- The infectious agent is of an uncommon nature (e.g. tropical diseases);
- The disease has not responded to first line antibiotics;
- The disease might be dangerous to other patients, and the patient might have to be isolated

== Society and culture ==
Several studies have reported associations between pathogen load in an area and human behavior. Higher pathogen load is associated with decreased size of ethnic and religious groups in an area. This may be due high pathogen load favoring avoidance of other groups, which may reduce pathogen transmission, or a high pathogen load preventing the creation of large settlements and armies that enforce a common culture. Higher pathogen load is also associated with more restricted sexual behavior, which may reduce pathogen transmission. It also associated with higher preferences for health and attractiveness in mates. Higher fertility rates and shorter or less parental care per child is another association that may be a compensation for the higher mortality rate. There is also an association with polygyny which may be due to higher pathogen load, making selecting males with a high genetic resistance increasingly important. Higher pathogen load is also associated with more collectivism and less individualism, which may limit contacts with outside groups and infections. There are alternative explanations for at least some of the associations although some of these explanations may in turn ultimately be due to pathogen load. Thus, polygyny may also be due to a lower male: female ratio in these areas but this may ultimately be due to male infants having increased mortality from infectious diseases. Another example is that poor socioeconomic factors may ultimately in part be due to high pathogen load preventing economic development.

== Fossil record ==
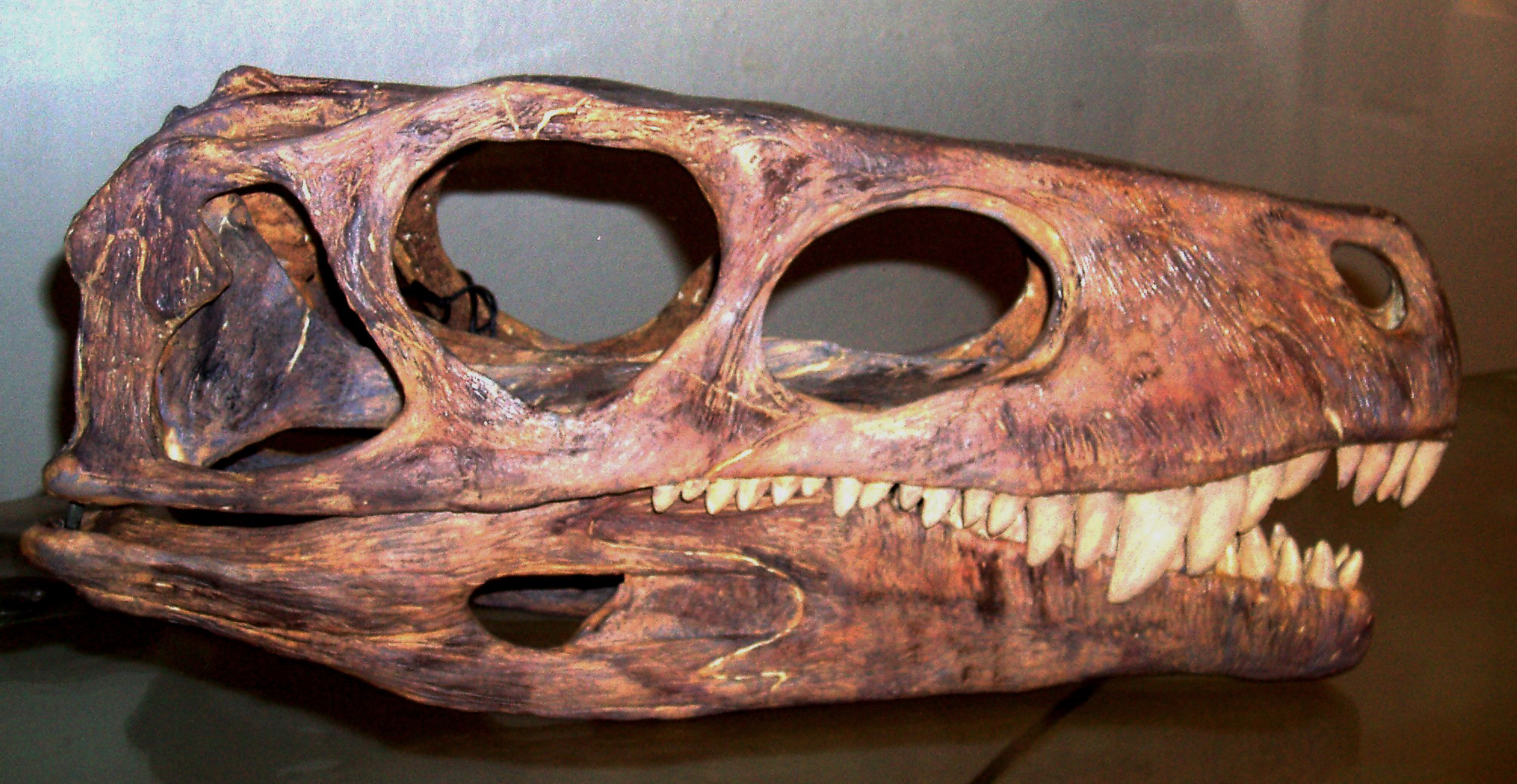
Herrerasaurus skull

Evidence of infection in fossil remains is a subject of interest for paleopathologists, scientists who study occurrences of injuries and illness in extinct life forms. Signs of infection have been discovered in the bones of carnivorous dinosaurs. When present, however, these infections seem to tend to be confined to only small regions of the body. A skull attributed to the early carnivorous dinosaur Herrerasaurus ischigualastensis exhibits pit-like wounds surrounded by swollen and porous bone. The unusual texture of the bone around the wounds suggests they were affected by a short-lived, non-lethal infection. Scientists who studied the skull speculated that the bite marks were received in a fight with another Herrerasaurus. Other carnivorous dinosaurs with documented evidence of infection include Acrocanthosaurus, Allosaurus, Tyrannosaurus and a tyrannosaur from the Kirtland Formation. The infections from both tyrannosaurs were received by being bitten during a fight, like the Herrerasaurus specimen.

== Outer space ==
A 2006 Space Shuttle experiment found that Salmonella typhimurium, a bacterium that can cause food poisoning, became more virulent when cultivated in space. On April 29, 2013, scientists in Rensselaer Polytechnic Institute, funded by NASA, reported that, during spaceflight on the International Space Station, microbes seem to adapt to the space environment in ways "not observed on Earth" and in ways that "can lead to increases in growth and virulence". More recently, in 2017, bacteria were found to be more resistant to antibiotics and to thrive in the near-weightlessness of space. Microorganisms have been observed to survive the vacuum of outer space.

== See also ==
- Biological hazard
- Blood-borne disease
- Coinfection
- Copenhagen Consensus
- Cordon sanitaire
- Epidemiological transition
- Foodborne illness
- Hospital-acquired infection
- Eradication of infectious diseases
- Infection control
- Isolation (health care)
- List of causes of death by rate
- List of diseases caused by insects
- List of infectious diseases
- Mathematical modelling of infectious disease
- Multiplicity of infection
- Neglected tropical diseases
- Outline of infectious disease concepts
- Sentinel surveillance
- Spillover infection
- Threshold host density
- Transmission (medicine)
- Vaccine-preventable diseases
- Waterborne diseases
