= Swayne (disambiguation) =

Swayne is a surname. It may also refer to:

== Schools in the United States ==
- Swayne College, Montgomery, Alabama, United States, a school for African Americans from 1868 to 1937
- The Swayne School, predecessor of Talladega College, a private, historically black college in Talladega, Alabama
- Swayne School, that served students from Owyhee, Nevada

== Other uses ==
- Swayne Latham (1898–1988), American college football quarterback
- Swayne Hall, Talladega College, a National Historic Landmark
- Swayne Field, a minor league baseball park in Toledo, Ohio
- SS Noah H. Swayne, original name of USS Arided, a World War II cargo ship

== See also ==
- Sweyn, a Scandinavian given name
