= William Budd =

English physician and epidemiologist

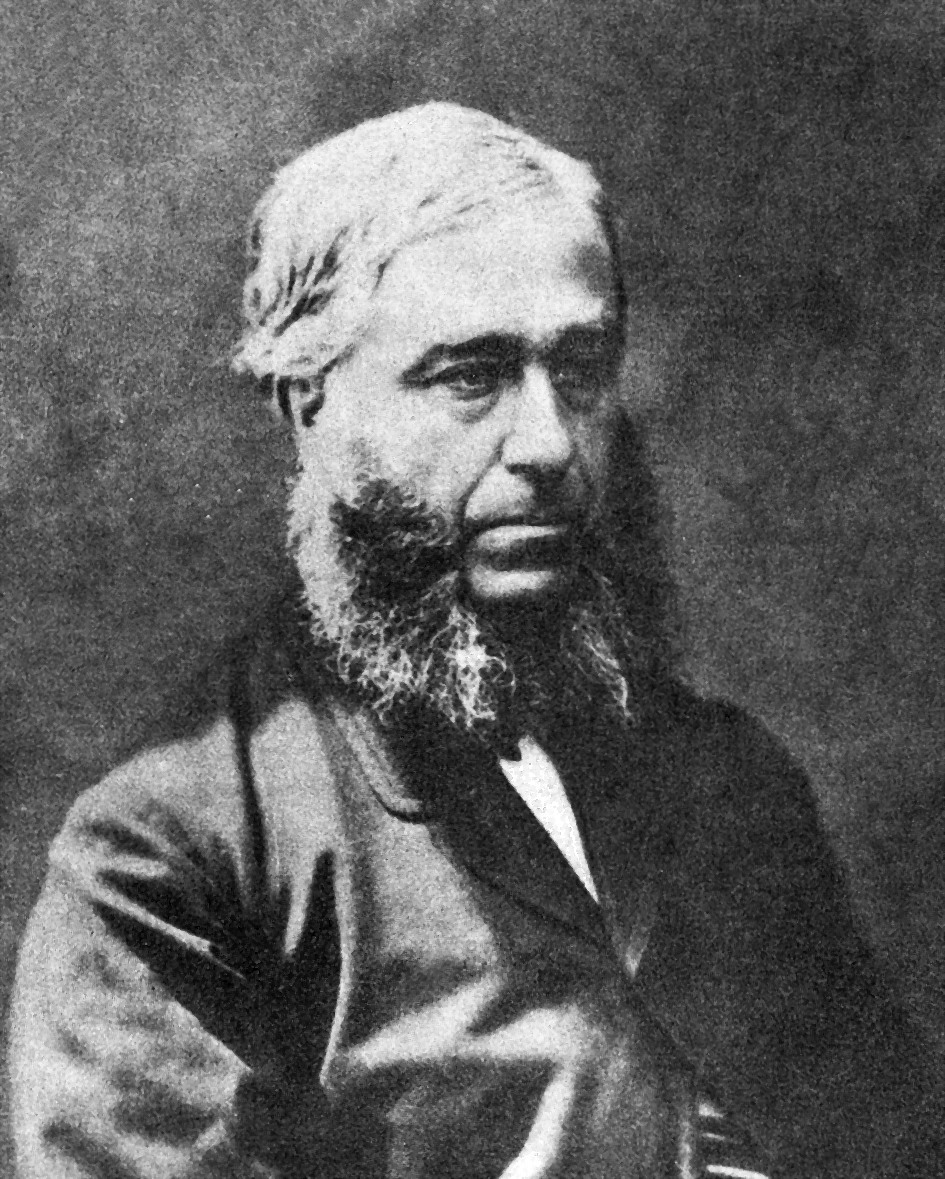
- Born: 14 September 1811; North Tawton, Devon, England
- Died: 14 January 1880 (aged 68); Clevedon, Somerset, England
- Citizenship: England
- Education: University of Edinburgh
- Known for: Recognizing contagious nature of infectious diseases.
- Scientific career
- Fields: Physician, Epidemiologist

William Budd (14 September 1811 – 9 January 1880) was an English physician and epidemiologist known for recognizing that infectious diseases were contagious. He recognized that the "poisons" involved in infectious diseases multiplied in the intestines of the sick, were present in their leaks, and could then be transmitted to the healthy through their consumption of contaminated water.

He particularly understood this about the transmission of cholera (as he learned from the work of the physician John Snow) and typhoid fever.

== Early life and education ==
William Budd was born in 1811 at North Tawton, Devon to an English surgeon, Samuel Budd, and his wife Catherine Wreford. He graduated MBChB from the University of Edinburgh in 1838. Six of his nine brothers, including George Budd, also went into medicine.

== Career ==
In 1841, Budd moved to Bristol, where he started a practice as a surgeon. He became physician to St. Peter's Hospital in 1842, and to the Bristol Royal Infirmary in 1847.

Using his theory and reading John Snow's essay about cholera in London (1849), Budd took measures to protect Bristol's water supply. He announced the importance of the work of two Bristol colleagues, Frederick Brittan and Joseph Griffiths Swayne, of organisms (described as "fungoid") in the "rice-water evacuations" of cholera victims. The work of Brittan and Swayne was disregarded at the time, when the miasma theory of infections from the air prevailed. Budd, on the other hand, is credited with decreasing the incidence of deaths in Bristol from cholera, from 2000 (out of a population of 140,000) in 1849 to 29 in 1866.

Budd's obituary is found in the Lancet 1880;i: 148. Part of William Budd's archive is held at the London School of Hygiene & Tropical Medicine.

== Selected works ==
- On diseases which affect corresponding parts of the body in a symmetrical manner (1842)
- Malignant cholera: its mode of propagation and its prevention (1849)
- "On intestinal fever," Lancet 1859;ii: 4–5, 28–30, 55–6, 80–2.
- "On the fever at the Clergy Orphan Asylum," Lancet 1856; ii: 618.
- "Memoranda on Asiatic cholera, its mode of spreading and its prevention" (1865), National Library of Medicine, National Institutes of Health
- Cholera and disinfection : Asiatic cholera in Bristol in 1866 (1871), National Library of Medicine, National Institutes of Health
- Typhoid Fever, Its Nature, Mode of Spreading, and Prevention, Retrieved 7 March 2010.
- On the Causes of Fevers, edited by: Dale C. Smith. Baltimore: The Johns Hopkins University Press, 1984.
