= Swayne =

Swayne is a surname. Notable people with the surname include:

- Charles Swayne (1842–1907), American district judge
- Charles Richard Swayne (1843–1921), first Resident Commissioner of the Gilbert and Ellice Islands, a British protectorate
- Deborah F. Swayne (born 1952), American statistician
- Desmond Swayne (born 1956), British politician
- Eric John Eagles Swayne (1863-1929), British Army officer and colonial administrator
- Geraldine Swayne (born 1965), British painter and filmmaker
- Giles Swayne (born 1946), British composer
- Harald George Carlos Swayne (1860-1940), British Army officer explorer, naturalist, big game hunter and writer, brother of Eric Swayne
- Harry Swayne (born 1965), American National Football League player
- Harry Swayne (cricketer) (1869–1911), English cricketer
- John Swayne (1890–1964), Second World War British Army lieutenant-general
- Joseph Griffiths Swayne (1819–1903), English obstetric physician who investigated cholera
- Kevin Swayne (born 1975), American football player
- Noah Haynes Swayne (1804–1884), American jurist and politician, a United States Supreme Court justice
- Steve Swayne, music professor
- Sylvia Swayne (born 1997), American politician
- Thomas Swayne, 18th century cricketer
- Wager Swayne (1834-1902), American Civil War Union Army major general awarded the Medal of Honor, son of Noah Haynes Swayne
- William Swayne (1862–1941), Anglican bishop and author
- William Marshall Swayne (1828–1918), American sculptor
- William Swayne (MP), Member of Parliament for Chippenham (UK Parliament constituency) in 1589
