= Émile Brumpt =

French parasitologist

Alexandre Joseph Émile Brumpt
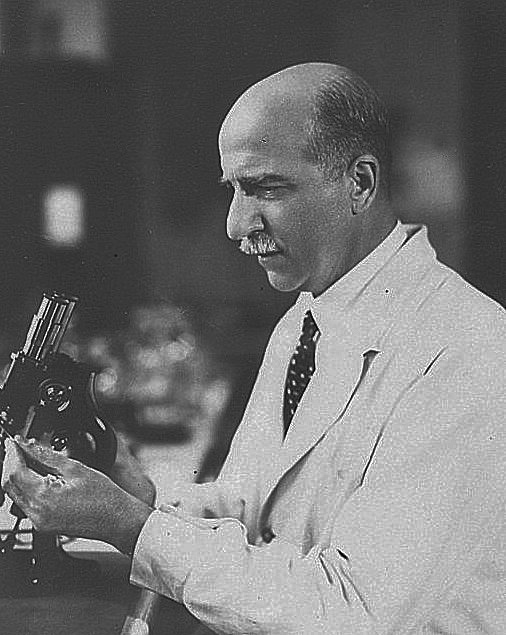
- Émile Brumpt (1877-1951)
- Born: March 10, 1877; Paris, France
- Died: July 8, 1951 (aged 74); Paris, France
- Citizenship: French
- Education: Faculté de Médecine de Paris
- Known for: Parasitology, Entomology
- Awards: Prix Savigny, Médaille d’or des épidémies, Manson Medal, Legion of Honour
- Scientific career
- Fields: Parasitology
- Workplaces: Faculté de Médecine de Paris
- Author abbrev. (botany): Brumpt
- Author abbrev. (zoology): Brumpt

Alexandre Joseph Émile Brumpt (10 March 1877, in Paris – 8 July 1951) was a French parasitologist.

He studied zoology and parasitology in Paris, obtaining his degree in science in 1901, and his medical doctorate in 1906. In 1919 he succeeded Raphaël Blanchard (1857–1919) as professor of parasitology to the Faculté de Médecine de Paris, a position he maintained until 1948. Much of his career was spent performing research in Africa and Latin America.

Brumpt is credited for introducing a technique known as xenodiagnosis into parasitological research. In 1935, he described Plasmodium gallinaceum, an avian malarial parasite that infects chickens and other fowl. He also conducted important research involving the African tsetse fly (Glossina palpalis) as a biological vector for trypanosomiasis. In addition, he did extensive studies of the diseases: schistosomiasis, Chagas disease, onchocerciasis and leishmaniasis.

He described Blastocystis hominis and Entamoeba dispar. The latter species helped to explain why most people who appeared to be infected with Entamoeba histolytica were asymptomatic. However, because there are no morphological differences between the two species, his proposal was largely ignored for over 50 years before being proven correct using molecular techniques.

The French Academy of Sciences awarded him the Prix Savigny for 1910. A number of parasitic species bear his name, including Plasmodium brumpti and Xenocoeloma brumpti. Also, a genus of phlebotomine sand flies, Brumptomyia, and a species of Corsican mosquito, Culex brumpti, are named after him.

Brumpt's best known written work is Précis de Parasitologie, which was published in six editions between 1910 and 1949. He was the author of many scientific papers, including several on the Anopheles mosquito and its relationship to malaria. He was the President of the Société zoologique de France in 1922. With Maurice Neveu-Lemaire and Maurice Langeron, he founded in 1923 the parasitological journal Annales de Parasitologie Humaine et Comparée, now continued as Parasite.
