= Maurice Langeron =

French mycologist, bryologist and paleobotanist

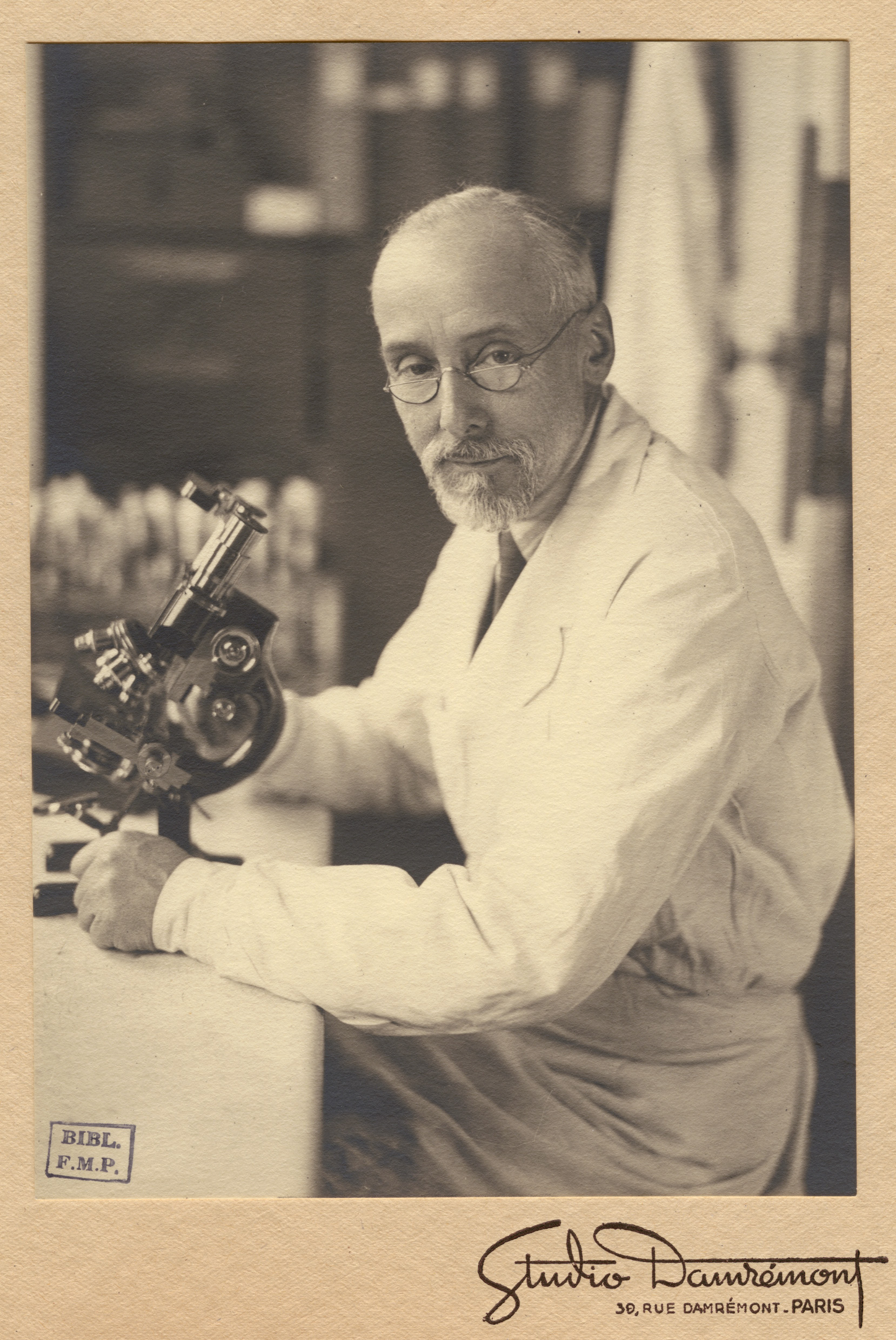
Maurice Langeron

Maurice Charles Pierre Langeron (French pronunciation: [mɔʁis ʃaʁl pjɛʁ lɑ̃ʒʁɔ̃]; 3 January 1874, in Dijon – 27 June 1950, in Bourg-la-Reine) was a French mycologist, bryologist and paleobotanist.

He studied natural sciences at the Muséum national d'histoire naturelle in Paris. In 1930 he was named director of the department of mycology in the laboratory of parasitology at the faculty of medicine in Paris. Two years later, he became adjoint-director in the laboratory of parasitology at the École pratique des hautes études. In 1942 he was appointed director of research at the Centre national de la recherche scientifique (CNRS).

In 1933 he became a member of the Société de biologie. With Émile Brumpt and Maurice Neveu-Lemaire, he founded the journal Les Annales de Parasitologie humaine et comparée, now continued as Parasite. The dermatophyte:genus Langeronia (Vanbreus., 1950) is named after him.

== Written works ==
In 1965 his Précis de mycologie was translated into English and published as "Outline of mycology". Other noted works by Langeron include:

- Muscinées de la Côte-d'Or : Études géographiques : Catalogue des muscinées de la Côte d'Or, 1898 – Bryophytes of Côte-d'Or.
- Contributions a l'étude de la flore fossile de Sézanne, 1899–1902 – Contributions to the study of fossil flora of Sézanne.
- Le genre Aleurites Forst (Euphorbiacées) systématique, anatomie, pharmacologie, 1902 – The genus Aleurites (Euphorbiaceae); systematics, anatomy and pharmacology.
- Études sur les végétaux fossiles du Trieu de Leval (Hainaut), 1907 – Studies of fossil flora of Trieu de Leval (Hainaut).
- Précis de microscopie; technique, expérimentation, diagnostic, 1913 – Outline of microscopy; techniques, experimentation, diagnostics.
- Coprologie microscopique, 1922 – Microscopy associated with coprology.
