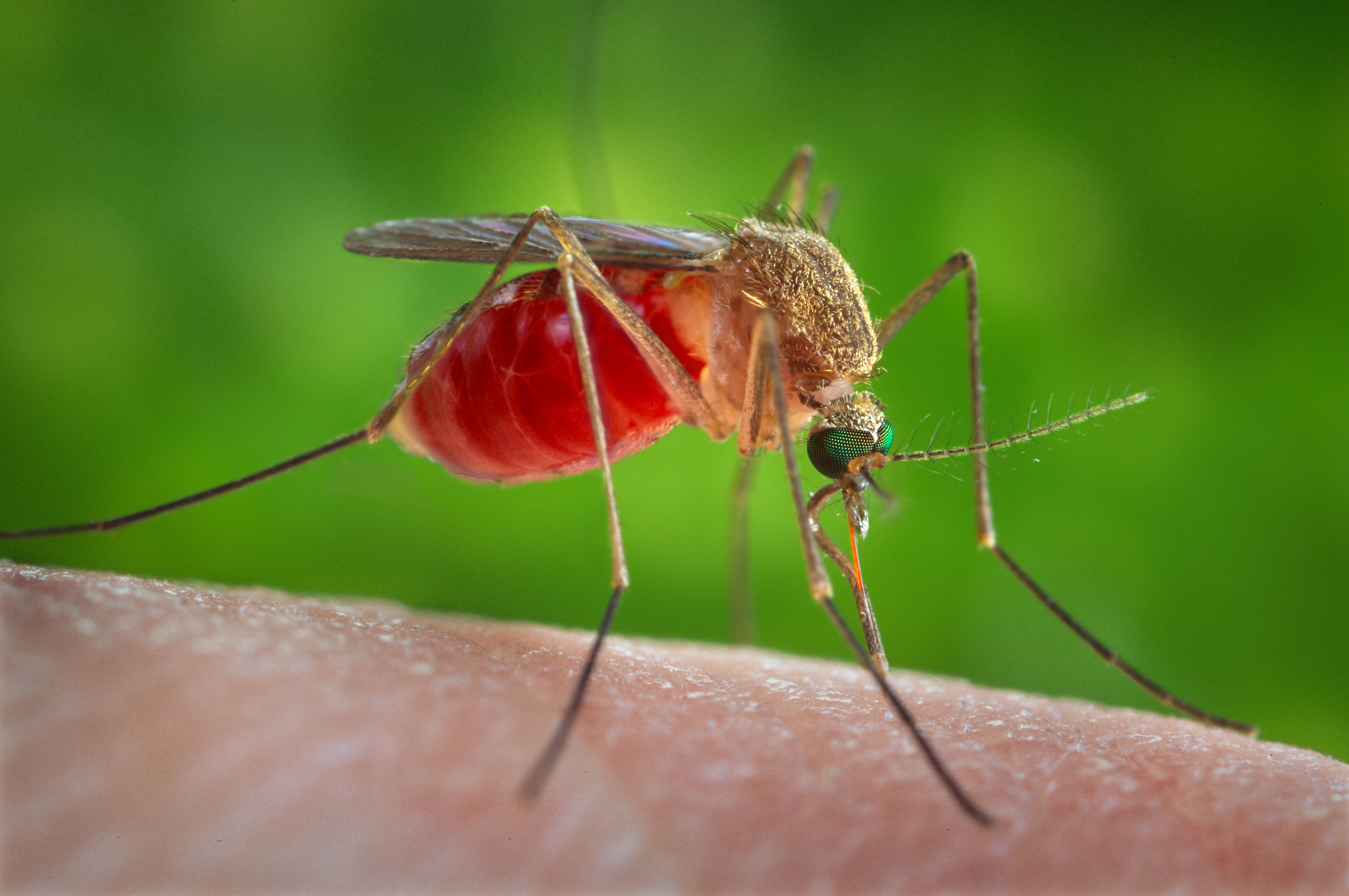

Scientific classification
- Kingdom: Animalia
- Phylum: Arthropoda
- Clade: Pancrustacea
- Class: Insecta
- Order: Diptera
- Family: Culicidae
- Genus: Culex
- Species: C. quinquefasciatus

Binomial name
- Culex quinquefasciatus Say, 1823

Synonyms
- Culex acer Walker, 1848; Culex aestuans Wiedemann, 1828; Culex aikenii Dyar & Knab, 1908; Culex albolineatus Giles, 1901; Culex anxifer Bigot, 1859; Culex aseyehae Dyar & Knab, 1915; Culex autumnalis Weyenbergh, 1882; Culex barbarus Dyar & Knab, 1906; Culex cartroni Ventrillon, 1905; Culex christophersii Theobald, 1907; Culex cingulatus Doleschall, 1856; Culex cubensis Bigot, 1857; Culex didieri Neveu-Lemaire, 1906; Culex fatigans Wiedemann, 1828; Culex fouchowensis Theobald, 1901; Culex hensemaeon Dyar, 1920; Culex luteoannulatus Theobald, 1901; Culex macleayi Skuse, 1889; Culex minor Theobald, 1908; Culex nigrirostris Enderlein, 1920; Culex pallidocephala Theobald, 1904; Culex penafieli Sanchez, 1885; Culex pungens Wiedemann, 1828; Culex pygmaeus Neveu-Lemaire, 1906; Culex quasilinealis Theobald, 1907; Culex quasipipiens Theobald, 1901; Culex raymondii Tamayo, 1907; Culex reesi Theobald, 1901; Culex revocator Dyar & Knab, 1909; Culex sericeus Theobald, 1901; Culex serotinus Philippi, 1865; Culex skusii Giles, 1900; Culex trillineatus Theobald, 1901; Culex zeltneri Neveu-Lemaire, 1906; Culicelsa fuscus Taylor, 1914

= Culex quinquefasciatus =

Species of mosquito

Culex quinquefasciatus (originally named Culex fatigans), commonly known as the southern house mosquito, is a medium-sized mosquito found in tropical and subtropical regions of the world. It is a vector of Wuchereria bancrofti, avian malaria, and arboviruses including St. Louis encephalitis virus, Western equine encephalitis virus, Zika virus and West Nile virus. It is taxonomically regarded as a member of the Culex pipiens species complex. Its genome was sequenced in 2010, and was shown to have 18,883 protein-coding genes.

== Etymology ==
American entomologist Thomas Say described Culex quinquefasciatus, which he collected along the Mississippi River, in 1823. Originally written as "C. 5-fasciatus", the name refers to five (quinque) black, broad, transverse bands ("fasciatus" or "fasciae") on the mosquito's dorsal abdomen. The name remains despite later revelations of more than five fasciae, thanks to improved microscopy. Although quinquefasciatus is the official scientific name, there are at least five synonymous names for this species.

== Taxonomy ==
Cx. quinquefasciatus is a member of the Culex pipiens species complex. Smith et al. 2004 develop an assay specifically for this complex and use it to confirm that it does encompass this species.

== Description ==
The adult C. quinquefasciatus is a medium-sized mosquito and is brown in colour. The body is about 3.96 to 4.25 mm long. While the main body is brown, the proboscis, thorax, wings, and tarsi are darker than the rest of the body. The head is light brown, with the lightest portion in the center. The antennae and the proboscis are about the same length, but in some cases, the antennae are slightly shorter than the proboscis. The flagellum has 13 segments that may have few or no scales. The scales of the thorax are narrow and curved. The abdomen has pale, narrow, rounded bands on the basal side of each tergite. Males can be differentiated from females in having large palps and feathery antennae.

The larva has a short and stout head. The mouth brushes have long yellow filaments used for filtering organic materials. The abdomen consists of eight segments, the siphon, and the saddle. Each segment has a unique setae pattern. The siphon is on the dorsal side of the abdomen, and is four times longer than its breadth. The siphon has multiple setae tufts. The saddle is barrel-shaped and located on the ventral side of the abdomen, with four long anal papillae protruding from the posterior end.

== Lifecycle ==
Mature C. quinquefasciatus females fly at night to nutrient-rich standing water to lay eggs. They breed profusely in dirty water collections, including stagnant drains, cesspools, septic tanks with leaks, burrow pits, and almost all organic polluted water collections. A single female can lay up to five rafts of eggs in a lifetime, with each raft containing 100 to 300 eggs. The exact number varies depending on climatic conditions. The larvae feed on organic material in the water and require between five and eight days to complete their development at 30 °C (86 °F). The larvae pass through four larval instars, and towards the end of the fourth instar, they stop eating and undergo moulting to give rise to pupae. After 36 hours at 27 °C (81 °F), adults emerge. The exact timing of development can vary depending on temperature. In optimum temperature and humidity, the lifecycle will be completed in seven days, passing through the egg, larval, pupal, and adult stages.

Both male and female adults take sugar meals from plants. After mating, the female seeks a blood meal from a mammal or bird, as ingested blood is necessary for egg development. C. quinquefasciatus shows a preference for the blood of birds, but will also commonly bite humans.

== Hosts ==
Known hosts include birds (Aves), cattle (Bos taurus), dogs (Canis familiaris), Equus including donkeys (E. asinus), cats (Felis), mice (Mus musculus), house sparrows (Passer domesticus), rats (Rattus), boars (Sus scrofa) and humans (Homo sapiens).

== Distribution ==
"Quinx" are among the world's most abundant peridomestic mosquitoes, earning the nickname "southern house mosquito". The species' place of origin is uncertain. It may have been native to the lowlands of West Africa, or to Southeast Asia. Cx. quinquefasciatus is now found throughout subtropical and tropical areas worldwide, including the Americas, Australia and New Zealand, except for exceedingly dry or cold regions. Thomas Say described the species as "exceedingly numerous and troublesome". It rests in trees and high places.

== As a vector ==
The southern house mosquito is a principal vector of numerous pathogens, transmitting the phlebovirus Rift Valley fever virus, and the two flaviviruses St. Louis encephalitis virus and West Nile virus, plus filarial worms and avian malarial parasites.

It transmits zoonotic diseases that affect humans and wild and domestic animals, such as lymphatic filariasis, avian malaria, St. Louis encephalitis, Western equine encephalitis, and West Nile fever, and may be a vector of the Zika virus. It causes infection through biting during blood meal. In the southern U.S., it is the primary vector of St. Louis encephalitis virus. In India and Southeast Asia, it is the primary vector of Wuchereria bancrofti, a nematode that causes lymphatic filariasis. It acts as an intermediate host for the helminth parasite by harbouring the larval stages. In Hawaii, it is the principal vector of avian malaria (Plasmodium relictum), to which historic extinctions and significant contemporary population declines in Hawaii's native honeycreeper species are attributed. It is the definitive host for the malarial parasite as it harbours the sexual cycle. In 2013 West Nile Virus positive specimens were collected in Southern California. Now, people have to stop the invasive spread to save the native birds.
