= Maurice Neveu-Lemaire =

French physician and parasitologist

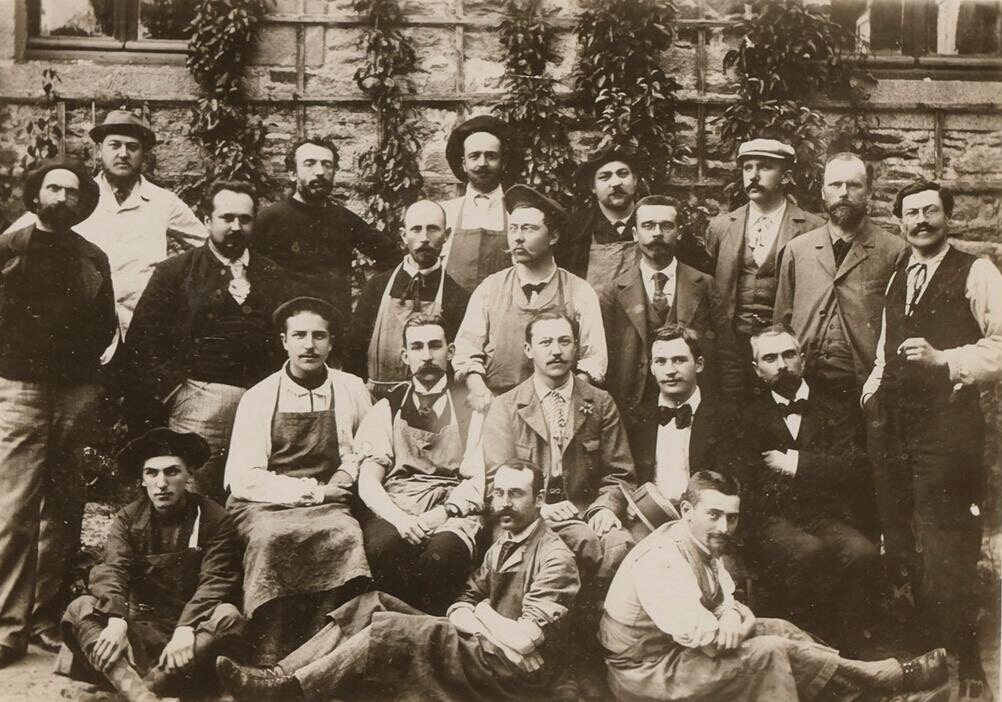
Workers at the Roscoff laboratory, 1896 (Neveu-Lemaire is in the middle of the second row).

Maurice Neveu-Lemaire (24 September 1872 in Montbéliard – 4 May 1951 in Paris) was a French physician and parasitologist.

After receiving his degree in natural sciences (1895), he spent several years as an intern in marine laboratories at Banyuls-sur-Mer, Roscoff and Tatihou, as well as performing duties as préparateur at the laboratory of parasitology in Paris. After receiving his medical doctorate, he participated as a physician and naturalist aboard the yacht Princesse Alice to the Canary Islands, Madeira, Cape Verde and the Azores (1901-02). During the following year, he performed similar roles as part of the Créqui Montfort et Sénéchal de la Grange mission in South America.

From 1904 to 1920, he was an associate professor to the faculty of medicine in Lyon, where for a number of years he gave lectures on parasitology. Afterwards, he was appointed chef des travaux de parasitologie to the faculty of medicine in Paris, and in 1926 he became a professor in the school of malariology at the university. During the 1920s, he conducted several scientific expeditions to the Caribbean, the Middle East and North Africa.

In 1901 he described a family of parasitic protists known as Haemogregarinidae. In 1924 he named several genera of parasites that affected large mammals (Khalilia, Paraquilonia, Buissonia, Henryella).

== Selected works ==
- Précis de parasitologie humaine, 1906 - Outline of human parasitology.
- Notes sur les mammiféres des hauts plateaux de l'Amérique du Sud, 1911 - Notes on mammals native to the upper plateaus of South America.
- Parasitologie des animaux domestiques, maladies parasitaires non bactériennes, 1912 - Parasitology involving domesticated animals, etc.
- Parasitologie des plantes agricoles, 1913 - Parasitology involving agricultural plants.
- Deux voyages cynégétiques et scientifiques en Afrique Occidentale Française, 1911–1914, (1920) - Two exploratory and scientific voyages in French West Africa from 1911 to 1914.
- Principes d'hygiéne et de médecine coloniales, 1925 - Principles of hygiene and colonial medicine.
- Traité d'helminthologie médicale et vétérinaire, 1936 - Treatise of medical and veterinary helminthology.
- Traité d'entomologie médicale et vétérinaire, 1938 - Treatise of medical and veterinary entomology.
- Traité de protozoologie médicale et vétérinaire, 1943 - Treatise of medical and veterinary protozoology.

In 1923, with Émile Brumpt and Maurice Langeron, he founded the journal Les Annales de Parasitologie humaine et comparée.
