= Joseph Griffiths Swayne =

English obstetric physician

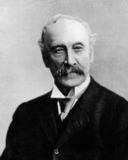
Joseph Griffiths Swayne

Joseph Griffiths Swayne (1819–1903) was an English obstetric physician. He is now known for investigations on cholera, which may have anticipated the discovery of the responsible micro-organism by Robert Koch

== Life ==
Born on 18 October 1819 in Bristol, he was the second son of John Champeny Swayne, a lecturer on midwifery in the Bristol medical school; his mother was the eldest daughter of Thomas Griffiths, an apothecary in Bristol. After education at Bristol college, where one of his teachers was Francis William Newman, he was apprenticed to his father and at the same time studied at the medical school and the Bristol Royal Infirmary.

Swayne went on to Guy's Hospital and became M.R.C.S. and a licentiate of the Society of Apothecaries in 1841. He also studied in Paris, and in 1842 graduated M.B. at the University of London, obtaining the gold medal in obstetric medicine and being bracketed with Alfred Baring Garrod for the gold medal in medicine. In 1845 he proceeded M.D. at London and joined his father as lecturer on midwifery in the Bristol medical school; he was sole lecturer from 1850 until 1895, when he was appointed emeritus professor. In 1853 he was elected physician accoucheur to the Bristol General Hospital, one of the first appointments of the kind out of London; he held this post until 1875, when he became consulting obstetric physician.

As a reputed consultant, Swayne had a large practice in the west of England. He was ahead of his time in stressing asepsis, and deprecated long hair or beards for those involved in surgery or midwifery. He died suddenly on 1 August 1903, and was buried at Arno's Vale cemetery, Bristol.

== Works ==
By 1843 Swayne was investigating cholera. In autumn 1849 the Second Cholera pandemic was threatening the city of Bristol, and the Bristol Medico-Chirurgical Society appointed a "microscopic committee" to look into the disease: it included Frederick Brittan, William Budd and others, as well as Swayne. He described a micro-organism that some have suggested was the "comma bacillus" which Robert Koch proved to be the cause of the disease in 1884. He took it to be a "fungus cell", and solicited help with verifying his research from microscopists including Arthur Hill Hassall and Edwin Lankester. George Busk, however, argued that the observation was of a uredo, that is, a fungal plant pathogen. The Royal College of Physicians shortly declared the matter closed.

Swayne published papers in medical journals, and Obstetric Aphorisms for the Use of Students (1856; 10th edit. 1893), which was translated into eight languages.

== Family ==
Swayne married Georgina (died 1865), daughter of the Rev. George Gunning of Deeping. They had one son and one daughter.
