= Murine respirovirus =

Virus classification
- (unranked): Virus
- Realm: Riboviria
- Kingdom: Orthornavirae
- Phylum: Negarnaviricota
- Class: Monjiviricetes
- Order: Mononegavirales
- Family: Paramyxoviridae
- Genus: Respirovirus
- Species: Murine respirovirus

Synonyms
- Sendai virus

Sendai virus, virus of rodents

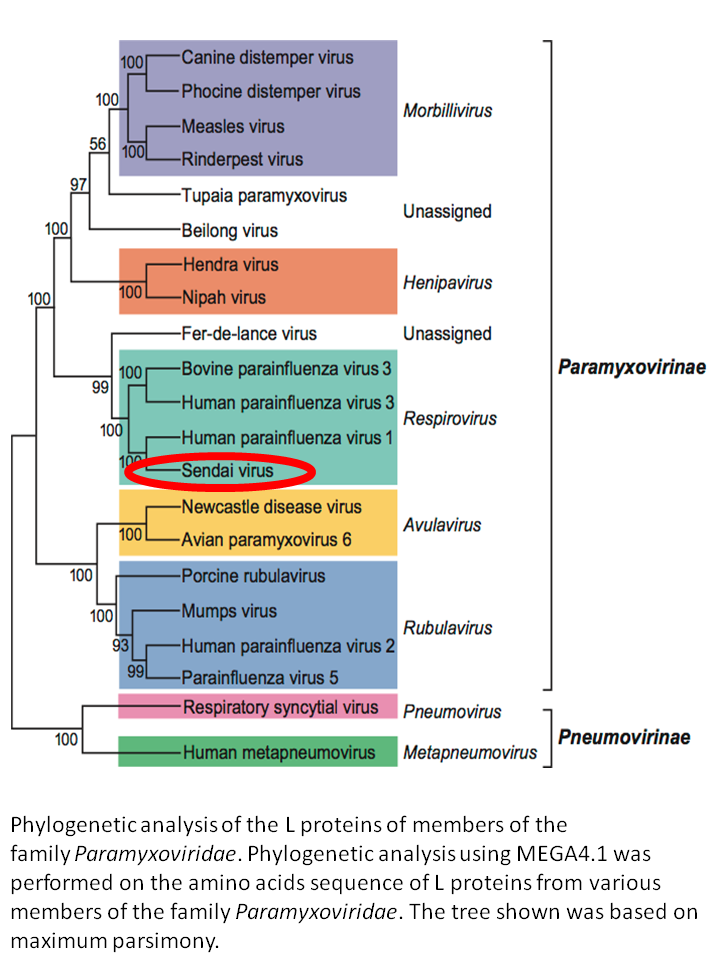
Phylogenetic tree

Murine respirovirus, now Respirovirus muris, formerly Sendai virus (SeV) and previously also known as murine parainfluenza virus type 1 or hemagglutinating virus of Japan (HVJ), is an enveloped, 150–200 nm diameter, negative sense, single-stranded RNA virus of the family Paramyxoviridae. It typically infects rodents and it is not pathogenic for humans or domestic animals.

Respirovirus muris is a member of the genus Respirovirus. The virus was isolated in the city of Sendai in Japan in the early 1950s. Since then, it has been actively used in research as a model pathogen. The virus is infectious for many cancer cell lines (see below), and has oncolytic properties demonstrated in animal models and in naturally occurring cancers in animals. Its ability to fuse eukaryotic cells and to form syncytium was used to produce hybridoma cells capable of manufacturing monoclonal antibodies in large quantities.

Recent applications of SeV-based vectors include the reprogramming of somatic cells into induced pluripotent stem cells and vaccine creation. For vaccination purpose the Sendai virus-based constructs could be delivered in a form of nasal drops, which may be beneficial in inducing a mucosal immune response. SeV has several features that are important in a vector for a successful vaccine: the virus does not integrate into the host genome, it does not undergo genetic recombination, it replicates only in the cytoplasm without DNA intermediates or a nuclear phase and it does not cause any disease in humans or domestic animals. Sendai virus is used as a backbone for vaccine development against Mycobacterium tuberculosis that causes tuberculosis, against HIV-1 that causes AIDS and against other viruses, including those that cause severe respiratory infections in children. The latter include human respiratory syncytial virus (HRSV), human metapneumovirus (HMPV) and human parainfluenza viruses (HPIV).

The vaccine studies against M. tuberculosis, HMPV, HPIV1 and, HPIV2 are in the pre-clinical stage, against HRSV a phase I clinical trial has been completed. The phase I clinical studies of SeV-based vaccination were also completed for HPIV1. They were done in adults and in 1–6-year-old children. As a result of vaccination against HPIV1, a significant boost in virus-specific neutralizing antibodies was observed. A SeV-based vaccine development against HIV-1 has reached a phase II clinical trial. In Japan intranasal Sendai virus-based SARS-CoV-2 vaccine was created and tested in a mouse model.

More recent applications (2024–2025) include non-integrative gene delivery for fertility restoration in mouse models, enhanced transduction in pancreatic cancer, and temperature-sensitive platforms for CRISPR-Cas9 editing in human stem cells and viral genome engineering.

== As an infection agent ==
SeV replication occurs exclusively in the cytoplasm of the host cell. The virus is using its own RNA polymerase. One replication cycle takes approximately 12–15 hours with one cell yielding thousands of virions.

=== Susceptible animals ===
The virus is responsible for a highly transmissible respiratory tract infection in mice, hamsters, guinea pigs, rats, and occasionally marmosets, with infection passing through both air and direct contact routes. Natural infection occurs by way of the respiratory tract. In animal facility airborne transmission can occur over a distance of 5–6 feet as well as through air handling systems. The virus can be detected in mouse colonies worldwide, generally in suckling to young adult mice. A study in France reported antibodies to SeV in 17% of mouse colonies examined. Epizootic infections of mice are usually associated with a high mortality rate, while enzootic disease patterns suggest that the virus is latent and can be cleared over the course of a year. Sub-lethal exposure to SeV can promote long-lasting immunity to further lethal doses of SeV. The virus is immunosuppressive and may predispose to secondary bacterial infections. There are no scientific studies, which were performed using modern detection methods, which would identify SeV as an infectious and decease causative for humans or domestic animals.

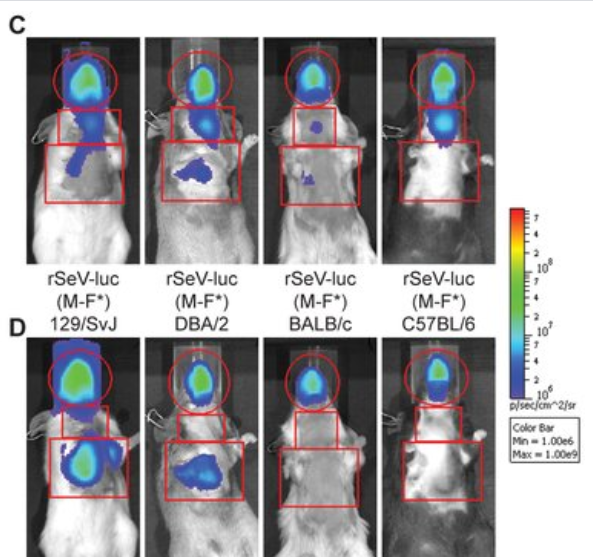
Non-invasive bioluminescence imaging of infection in the respiratory tracts of living mice

Electron microscopy of virus

==== Variable susceptibility to infection in mouse and rat strains ====
Inbred and outbred mouse and rat strains have very different susceptibility to Sendai virus infection. Visualization of SeV infection in live animals demonstrates this difference. The 129/J mice tested were approximately 25,000-fold more sensitive than SJL/J mice. C57BL/6 mice are highly resistant to the virus, while DBA/2J mice are sensitive. C57BL/6 mice showed slight loss of body weight after SeV administration, which returned to normal later. Only 10% mortality rate was observed in C57BL/6 mice after the administration of very high virulent dose of 1*10^{5} TCID50. It was shown that resistance to the lethal effects of Sendai virus in mice is genetically controlled and expressed through control of viral replication within the first 72 hours of infection. Treatment of both strains with exogenous IFN before and during viral infection led to an increase in survival time in C57BL/6 mice, but all animals of both strains ultimately succumb to SeV caused disease. If a mouse survives a SeV infection, it develops a lifelong immunity to subsequent viral infections.

There are SeV-resistant F344 rats and susceptible BN rats.

==== Course of infection ====
In the host airways the virus titer reaches a peak after 5–6 days post infection initiation that decreases to undetectable levels by day 14. The virus promotes a descending respiratory infection, which begins in the nasal passages, passes through the trachea into the lungs and causes necrosis of the respiratory epithelium. The necrosis is mild in the first few days of infection, but later became severe by peaking around day 5. By day 9, the cells of the surface of the airways regenerate. Focal interstitial pneumonia can developed accompanied by inflammation and lesions of various degrees on the lungs. Usually, the respiratory system shows signs of healing within 3 weeks of infection, however, residual lesions, inflammation, or permanent scarring can occur. 6–8 days after the infection initiation serum antibodies appear. They remain detectable for about 1 year.

==== Symptoms in animals ====
- Sneezing
- Hunched posture
- Respiratory distress
- Porphyrin discharge from eyes and/or nose
- Lethargy
- Failure to thrive in surviving babies and young rats
- Anorexia

==== Diagnosis and prophylaxis ====
SeV induces lesions within the respiratory tract, usually associated with bacterial inflammation of the trachea and lung (tracheitis and bronchopneumonia, respectively). However, the lesions are limited, and aren't indicative solely of SeV infection. Detection, therefore, makes use of SeV-specific antigens in several serological methods, including ELISA, immunofluorescence, and hemagglutination assays, with particular emphasis on use of the ELISA for its high sensitivity (unlike the hemagglutination assay) and its fairly early detection (unlike the immunofluorescence assay).

In a natural setting, the respiratory infection of Sendai virus in mice is acute. From the extrapolation of the infection of laboratory mice, the presence of the virus may first be detected in the lungs 48 to 72 hours following exposure. As the virus replicates in the respiratory tract of an infected mouse, the concentration of the virus grows most quickly during the third day of infection. After that, the growth of the virus is slower but consistent. Typically, the peak concentration of the virus is on the sixth or seventh day, and rapid decline follows that by the ninth day. A fairly vigorous immune response mounted against the virus is the cause of this decline. The longest period of detected presence of the virus in a mouse lung is fourteen days after infection.

Eaton et al. advises that, when controlling an outbreak of SeV, disinfecting the laboratory environment and vaccinating the breeders, as well as eliminating infected animals and screening incoming animals, should clear the problem very quickly. Imported animals should be vaccinated with SeV and placed in quarantine, while, in the laboratory environment, breeding programs should be discontinued, and the non-breeding adults isolated for two months.

=== Virus-induced immunosuppression ===
The virus is a powerful immunomodulator. SeV can act in both directions: it can activate or suppress the immune response depending on the type of cell, host and time period after infection initiation. The virus can suppress the IFN production and response pathways as well as inflammation pathway.

==== Apoptosis inhibition ====
Sendai virus P gene encodes a nested set of proteins (C', C, Y1 and Y2), which are named to collectively as the C proteins (see the section "Genome structure" below). C proteins of SeV are able to suppress apoptosis. The antiapoptotic activity of the C proteins supports SeV infection in the host cells.

==== Interferon production and signal transduction inhibition ====
The virus prevents the stimulation of type 1 IFN production and subsequent cell apoptosis in response to virus infection by inhibiting the activation of IRF-3. Two virus proteins: C and V are mainly involved in this process. SeV can attenuate cell defense mechanisms and allow itself to escape from host innate immunity by inhibiting the interferon response pathway in addition to inhibiting the interferon production. The table below demonstrates the inhibition mechanism.

Viral proteins and their function in immunosuppression
protein	mapped to amino-acids	binding with	effect
C-protein		IKKα serine / threonine kinase	The binding prevents the phosphorylation of IRF7 and inhibits a pathway that includes a Toll-like receptor (TLR7) and TLR9-induction of IFN-alpha in plasmacytoid dendritic cells.
C-protein		interferon-alpha/beta receptor subunit 2 (IFNAR2)	The binding inhibits IFN-α-stimulated tyrosine phosphorylation of the upstream receptor-associated kinases TYK2 and JAK1.
C-protein	99-204	N-terminal domain of STAT1	The binding suppresses the signal transduction pathways of interferon alpha/beta (IFN-α/β) and IFN-γ
C-protein			The C-protein inhibits the production of nitric oxide (NO) by murine macrophages that has cytotoxic activity against viruses.
C-protein			The C protein decreases generation of dsRNA, therefore it is keeping PKR inactive to maintain proteins translation in a host cell.
V-protein		MDA5	The binding inhibits downstream MDA5 activation of the IFN promoter.
V-protein		RIG-I	The binding prevents downstream RIG-I signaling to the mitochondrial antiviral signaling protein (MAVS) by disrupting TRIM25 -mediated ubiquitination of RIG-I. The binding suppresses inducible NO synthase (iNOS) via the RIG-I/TRIM25 pathway and decreases the production of nitric oxide (NO) in infected macrophages.
V-protein		TRIM25	The binding prevents downstream RIG-I signaling to the mitochondrial antiviral signaling protein (MAVS) by disrupting TRIM25 -mediated ubiquitination of RIG-I. The binding suppresses inducible NO synthase (iNOS) via the RIG-I/TRIM25 pathway and decreases the production of nitric oxide (NO) in infected macrophages.
V-protein			The V-protein suppresses the production of interleukin-1β, by inhibiting the assembly of the inflammasome NLRP3.
Y1-protein	149-157	Ran	The nuclear translocation of viral protein is mediated by Ran GTPase. The amino acids represent nuclear localization, which is believed to suppress IFN-induced gene expression.

Anti-IFN activity of C protein is shared across the family Paramyxoviridae, and therefore appears to play an important role in paramyxovirus immune evasion. Human parainfluenza virus type 1 (HPIV1), which is a close relative of SeV and is (in contrast to SeV) a successful human pathogen, does not express V proteins, only C proteins. So, all needed functions provided by V in SeV can be provided by C in HPIV1. Thus, C and V have these "overlapping functions" because of the multi-faceted nature of host defense that can be countered at so many places, and exactly how well and where will in part explain host restriction.

The C-protein also appears to be responsible for limiting the production of NO in infected macrophages, which in turn reduces inflammation.

=== Host restriction and safety for domestic animals ===
Currently, there is no scientific data obtained using modern detection methods that would identify SeV as an infectious - disease causing agent for humans or domestic animals. Modern methods for the identification of pathogenic microorganisms have never detected SeV in pigs or other domestic animals, despite the isolation of other paramyxoviruses. Consequently, it is recognized that Sendai virus disease causing infection is host restrictive for rodents and the virus does not cause disease in humans or domestic animals, which are natural hosts for their own parainfluenza viruses. After experimental SeV infection the virus can replicate and shed from the upper and lower respiratory tract of African green monkeys and chimpanzees, but it is not causing any disease. Sendai virus has been used and demonstrated high safety profile in clinical trials involving both adults and children to immunize against human parainfluenza virus type 1, since the two viruses share common antigenic determinants and trigger the generation of cross-reactive neutralizing antibodies. The study that was published in 2011 demonstrated that SeV neutralizing antibodies (which were formed due to human parainfluenza virus type 1 past infection) can be detected in 92.5% of human subjects worldwide with a median EC_{50} titer of 60.6 and values ranging from 5.9 to 11,324. Low anti-SeV antibodies background does not block the ability of SeV-base vaccine to promote antigen-specific T cell immunity.

==== Historic safety concerns ====
In 1952, Kuroya and his colleagues attempted to identify an infectious agent in human tissue samples at Tohoku University Hospital, Sendai, Japan. The samples were taken from the lung of a newborn child that was affected by fatal pneumonia. The primary isolate from the samples was passaged in mice and subsequently in embryonated eggs. The isolated infectious agent was later called Sendai virus, which was used interchangeably with the name "hemagglutinating virus of Japan". Kuroya and his colleagues were convinced that they isolated the virus, which is a new etiological agent for human respiratory infections. Later in 1954, Fukumi and his colleagues at the Japan National Institute of Health put forward an alternative explanation for the origin of the virus. It was suggested that the mice used to passage the virus were infected with the mouse virus. Thus, mouse virus was later transferred to embryonated eggs, isolated and finally named the Sendai virus. This explanation of Fukumi, pointing to the mouse rather than the human origin of the virus, has been supported by numerous scientific data later. The historical aspects of the Sendai virus isolation and controversy behind it are well described in the review. Thus, for some time, it was erroneously assumed that Sendai virus is human disease causing pathogen. The incorrect assumption that the virus was isolated from human infectious material is still reported by Encyclopædia Britannica and by ATCC in the description of the history of the viral isolate Sendai/52. It was also believed that the virus could cause disease not only in humans but also in pigs, because antibodies to the virus were often found in their organisms during the swine epidemic in Japan in 1953–1956. High incidence of seropositivity to the virus was observed in pigs in 15 districts of Japan. An explanation was later found for this widespread detection of antibodies (see the section below). Yet, despite overwhelming evidence that indicate that SeV is host restrictive rodent pathogen, in some veterinary manuals. and safety leaflets, SeV is still listed as a virus that can cause disease in pigs. Similar information is provided by Encyclopædia Britannica. In reality, the multiple isolates of paramyxoviruses in pigs, using modern nucleic acid sequencing methods, have never been identified as SeV.

==== Antigenic stability and cross-reactive antibodies ====
All viruses in the family Paramyxoviridae are antigenically stable; therefore the family representatives that are close relatives and belong to the same genus, most likely, share common antigenic determinants. Thus, porcine parainfluenza 1, which has high sequence homology with SeV and also belongs to the same genus Respirovirus as SeV, probably, has cross-reactive antibodies with SeV. Perhaps the porcine parainfluenza 1 was responsible for pigs disease in Japan in 1953–1956. However, the antigenic cross-reactivity among these two representatives within the genus Respirovirus may explain why SeV antibodies were found in sick pigs, and why it was thought that SeV was the etiological causative agent of pigs disease. Human parainfluenza virus type 1 also shares common antigenic determinants with SeV and triggers the generation of cross-reactive neutralizing antibodies. This fact can explain wide spread detection of SeV antibodies in humans in the 1950s–1960s. Recently published study also showed this wide spread detection. The study that was published in 2011 demonstrated that SeV neutralizing antibodies (which were formed due to human parainfluenza virus type 1 past infection) can be detected in 92.5% of human subjects worldwide with a median EC_{50} titer of 60.6 and values ranging from 5.9 to 11,324. Low anti-SeV antibodies background does not block the ability of SeV-base vaccine to promote antigen-specific T cell immunity.

=== Virus shedding in airways of non-natural hosts ===
Sendai virus administration to non-natural hosts results in shedding virions in the airways. Thus, 10 hours later after intranasal SeV administration, infectious virions carrying foreign trans genes can be detected in sheep's' lungs. Moreover, SeV replicates to detectable levels in the upper and lower respiratory tract of African green monkeys and chimpanzees.

=== Virus-induced antiviral immunity ===
SeV can overcome antiviral mechanisms in some of its natural hosts (some rodents), but the virus is ineffective in overcoming these mechanisms in some other organisms that are virus resistant. Both innate and adaptive immunity promote efficient recovery from SeV infection.

==== SeV stimulates interferon production and transduction pathway ====
The main component of innate antiviral response is type I interferons (IFNs) production and most cells can produce type I IFNs, including IFN-α and -β. The recognition by cellular molecules that are called pattern recognition receptors (PRR) of triggering viral elements, such as the virus genomic RNA, the replication intermediary double-stranded RNA, or the viral ribonucleoproteins, promotes IFN production and response pathways. Viral genomic and protein components can bind variable PRRs and stimulate a signaling pathway that results in the activation of the transcription factors, which relocate to nucleus and trigger type I IFNs transcription.

Viral stimulation of RIG-1 and MDA-5 mediated IFN production

===== Interferon production =====
Because of powerful interferon stimulating properties, before recombinant interferon alpha became available for medical use, SeV was selected, among other viruses, for the industrial large-scale IFN production. A procedure involving inactivated SeV treatment of human peripheral blood leukocytes from donors' blood was used for this production.

Below is a table that listed known PRRs and interferon regulatory factors that are getting activated upon SeV infection.

Molecular mechanisms of SeV mediated stimulation of IFN production
Molecules	Alias	Effect
Pattern recognition receptors (PRR)
Toll-like receptors	TLR	SeV infection stimulates mRNA expression of TLR1, TLR2, TLR3, and TLR7 in macrophages. This effect is IFN-alpha/beta dependent because anti-IFN-alpha/beta neutralizing antibodies down regulate this mRNA transcription stimulation. Human mast cell infection with SeV induces an antiviral response with activation of expression of type 1 IFN and TLR-3.
NLRC5		Using human embryonic kidney cells (HEK 293T) it has been shown that SeV can stimulate production of a pattern recognition receptor NLRC5, which is a cytosolic protein expressed mainly in hematopoietic cells.
Retinoic acid-inducible gene I	RIG-1	RIG-1-IRF7-mediated induction of IFN-α by SeV requires both RIG-I and mitochondrial antiviral-signaling protein (MAVS) expression. MAVS is also needed for SeV induction of IκB kinase (IKK), IRF3 and IFN-β in human cells. Single-stranded Sendai virus genomic RNA bearing 5′-triphosphates activates the RIG-I mediated IFN-beta production. SeV replication triggers activation of MAPK/ERK pathway (also known as the Ras-Raf-MEK-ERK pathway) in a RIG-I-dependent manner in dendritic cells (DC) and in fibroblasts. RIG-I-mediated activation of this pathway by SeV results in type I IFN production. Human mast cell infection with SeV induces an antiviral response with activation of expression of type 1 IFN and RIG-1.
Melanoma differentiation-associated antigen 5	MDA5	MDA5 has been shown to be an important participant in the antiviral SeV response and IFN type I production. Human mast cell infection with SeV induces an antiviral response with activation of expression of type 1 IFN and MDA-5.
Interferon regulatory factors
Interferon regulatory factor 3	IRF-3	SeV can activate the ubiquitously expressed IRF-3 by triggering its post-translational phosphorylation in human cells. IRF-3, is activated by phosphorylation on a specific serine residue, Ser^{396}.
Interferon regulatory factor 7	IRF-7	There is also some evidence that demonstrates that SeV activates IRF-7.

====== Cells producing interferon in response to SeV ======
Types of cells that produce interferon in response to SeV
Cell type	Effect
Human peripheral blood leukocytes	Sendai-virus-induced human peripheral blood leukocytes produce the interferon alpha (IFN-α) and the interferon gamma (IFN-γ). The SeV induced IFN-α consists from at least nine different sub types of IFN-α: 1a, 2b, 4b, 7a, 8b, 10a, 14c, 17b and 21b. Among these sub types IFN-α1 represents about 30% of total IFN-α. It was shown that the HN of paramyxoviruses is a potent inducer of type 1 IFN in human blood mononuclear cells.
Lymphoid cells	SeV infection of Namalwa cells, which originated from human Burkitt lymphoma, transiently induces the transcriptional expression of multiple IFN-A genes. It also has been shown that in these cells that SeV virus stimulates an expression of IFNα8, IFNα13, IFNβ and IFN type III (IFN-lambda, IFNλ): (L28α, IL28β, IL29).
Monocytes and dendritic cells	Monocytes and dendritic cells produce IFN alpha/beta in response to SeV stimulation. However, plasmacytoid dendritic cells (pDC), despite inability to be infected by SeV, produce higher level of IFN-1 compared to monocytes and monocyte-derived dendritic cells in response to SeV. This happens most likely due to the higher levels of constitutively expressed IRF-7 in pDC compared to monocytes and monocyte-derived dendritic cells. The recognition of SeV by pDC happens through TLR7 activation and requires transport of cytosolic viral replication products into the lysosome by the process of autophagy. Moreover, for pDC, autophagy was found to be required for these cells production of IFN-α. Among conventional DCs, only two subsets, namely CD4^{+} and CD8α− CD4− "double negative" dendritic cells are capable of producing IFN-α and IFN-β in response to SeV infection. However, all conventional DC subsets, including CD8α^{+} can be infected with SeV. SeV has the ability to replicate and to grow to high titers in human monocyte-derived DCs. On the other hand, pDCs do not produce a significant number of SeV virions after infection. When SeV is inactivated UV irradiation, it triggers lower levels of IFN-α production in pDCs compared to the levels induced by live virus. Additionally, SeV has been shown to induce the production of IFN type III (IFN-lambda) by human plasmacytoid dendritic cells. In the case of mouse dendritic cells, UV-inactivated SeV can induce the production of type I IFN. Similarly, some tumor cell lines also respond to UV-inactivated SeV by producing type I IFN. However, similar to human pDCs, UV-inactivated SeV elicits lower levels of IFN-α production in mouse pDCs compared to the response triggered by live virus.
Fibroblasts	Interferon-beta (IFN-β) production in human fibroblast cells also occurs in response to SeV treatment. It has been shown that SeV infects human lung fibroblasts MRC-5 and induces the release of IFN-beta into the culture medium from these infected cells.
Mast cells	Human mast cell infection SeV induces the expression of type 1 IFN.
Astrocytes	SeV triggers high IFN-beta production in murine astrocytes. This triggering is independent from TLR3 expression because it happens in TLR3 double negative mice.
Spleen cells	HN of SeV can induce type 1 IFN production in mouse spleen.

===== Interferon response pathway protects some cells from SeV infection =====
SeV can stimulate or inhibit the IFN-beta response pathway depending on the type of cell and host. If SeV triggers IFN production, the produced IFN further protects cells from next rounds of SeV infection. Multiple examples of IFN-beta protecting cells from SeV are described. Pretreatment of human lung fibroblasts MRC-5 cells with IFN-beta inhibits the replication of SeV.

A similar IFN-beta protection against the virus has been observed for some human malignant cells that maintain the IFN response pathway. HeLa cells can be infected with SeV; however, incubation of these cells with IFN-beta causes inhibition of SeV replication. Multiple interferon stimulated genes (ISG) were identified as being required for this inhibition including IRF-9, TRIM69, NPIP, TDRD7, PNPT1 and so on. One of this genes TDRD7 was investigated in more detail. The functional TDRD7 protein inhibits the replication of SeV and other paramyxoviruses, suppressing autophagy, which is necessary for productive infection with these viruses.

SeV also triggers the expression of IFN induced Ifit2 protein that is involved in protecting mice from SeV through as yet unknown mechanism. In addition, SeV triggers the expression of the chemokine interferon-γ inducible protein 10 kDa (CXCL10), which is involved in chemotaxis, induction of apoptosis, regulation of cell growth and mediation of angiostatic effects. Human mast cell infection with SeV induces expression of interferon-stimulated genes MxA and IFIT3 in addition to activation of expression of type 1 IFN, MDA-5, RIG-1 and TLR-3.

===== SeV stimulation of production of inflammatory cytokines, inflammasomes and beta-defensins =====
====== Cytokines ======
Sendai virus can induce the production of many cytokines that enhance cellular immune responses. Some evidence that demonstrates that SeV activates the transcription factor NF-κB and this activation helps in protection against SeV infection. SeV can stimulate the production of macrophage inflammatory protein-1α (MIB-1α) and –β (MIB-1β), RANTES (CCL5), tumor necrosis factor-alpha (TNF-alpha), tumor necrosis factor-beta (TNF-beta), interleukin-6 (IL-6 ), interleukin-8 (IL-8), interleukin-1 alpha (IL1A), interleukin-1 beta (IL1B), platelet-derived growth factor (PDGF-AB) and small concentrations of interleukin-2 (IL2) and GM-CSF. Sendai virus can trigger production of interleukin 12 (IL12) and interleukin 23 (IL23) in human macrophages. Even plasmids that deliver the F-coding gene of SeV to tumor cells in model animals trigger the production of RANTES (CCL5) in tumor-infiltrated T-lymphocytes. SeV induces the production of B cell-activating factor by monocytes and by some other cells. Heat-inactivated SeV virus induces the production of IL-10 and IL-6 cytokines by dendritic cells (DC). Most likely, F protein is responsible for this induction because reconstituted liposomes containing F protein can stimulate IL-6 production by DC. The production of IL-6 in response to SeV infection is restricted to conventional dendritic cells (DCs]) subsets, such as CD4^{+} and double negative (dnDC).

The UV-inactivated SeV (and likely the alive virus as well) can stimulate dendritic cells to secrete chemokines and cytokines such as interleukin-6, interferon-beta, chemokine (C-C motif) ligand 5, and chemokine (C-X-C motif) ligand 10. These molecules activate both CD8^{+} T cells as well as natural killer cells. UV-inactivated SeV triggers the production of an intercellular adhesion molecule-1 (ICAM-1, CD54), which is a glycoprotein that serves as a ligand for macrophage-1 antigen (Mac-1) and lymphocyte function-associated antigen 1 (LFA-1 (integrin)). This induced production happens through the activation of NF-κB downstream of the mitochondrial antiviral signaling pathway and the RIG-I. The increased concentration of ICAM-1 on the cells surface increases the vulnerability of these cells to natural killer cells. It has been shown in the Namalwa cells that SeV virus stimulates an expression of many genes involved in immune defense pathways, such as type I and type II IFN signaling, as well as cytokine signaling. Among the ten most virus-induced mRNAs are IFNα8, IFNα13, IFNβ, IFNλ: (L28α, IL28β, IL29), OASL, CXCL10, CXCL11 and HERC5.

====== Stimulation of inflammasome helps protect against SeV infection ======
Using human embryonic kidney cells (HEK 293T) it has been shown that SeV can stimulate production of a pattern recognition receptor NLRC5, which is a cytosolic protein expressed mainly in hematopoietic cells. This production activates the cryopyrin (NALP3) inflammasome. Using human monocytic cell line-1 (THP-1) it has been shown that SeV can activate signal transduction by mitochondrial antiviral-signaling protein signaling (MAVS), which is a mitochondria-associated adaptor molecule that is required for optimal NALP3-inflammasome activity. Through MAVS signaling SeV stimulates the oligomerization of NALP3 and triggers NALP3-dependent activation of caspase-1 that, in turn, stimulates caspase 1-dependent production of interleukine -1 beta (IL-1β).

====== Stimulation of beta-defensin production ======
SeV is a very effective stimulant of expression of human beta-defensin-1 (hBD-1). This protein is a member of the beta-defensin family of proteins that bridges innate and adaptive immune responses to a pathogen infection. In response to SeV infection, the production of hBD-1 mRNA and protein increases 2 hours after exposure to the virus in purified plasmacytoid dendritic cells or in PBMC.

==== Long-term antiviral immunity ====
After viral infection in rodents, type I IFNs promote SeV clearance and speed up the migration and maturation of dendritic cells. However, soon after viral infection, animals efficiently generate cytotoxic T cells independently of type I IFN signaling and clear the virus from their lungs. Moreover, even the animals that are unresponsive to type I IFN develop long-term anti-SeV immunity in a form of memory response that includes generation of CD8^{+} T cells and neutralizing antibodies. This memory response can protect animals against further challenge with a lethal dose of virus.

=== Phosphorylation ===
SeV infection causes changes in a host cell protein phosphorylation, triggering phosphorylation of at least of 1347 host proteins.

== As an oncolytic agent ==
Sendai virus-based anticancer therapy for model and companion animals has been reported in several scientific papers. The described studies demonstrate that Sendai virus has a potential of becoming a safe and effective therapeutic agent against a wide range of human cancers. High genomic stability of SeV is a very desirable trait for oncolytic viruses. SeV is not likely to evolve into a pathogenic strain or into a virus with decreased oncolytic potential. The cytoplasmic replication of the virus results in a lack of host genome integration and recombination, which makes SeV safer and more attractive candidate for broadly used therapeutic oncolysis compared to some DNA viruses or retroviruses.

=== Safety for humans ===
One of the great advantages of the Sendai virus as a potential oncolytic agent is its safety. Even though the virus is widespread in rodent colonies and has been used in laboratory research for decades, it has never been observed that it can cause human disease. Moreover, Sendai virus has been used in clinical trials involving both adults and 1–6-year-old children. to immunize against human parainfluenza virus type 1, since the two viruses share common antigenic determinants and trigger the generation of cross-reactive neutralizing antibodies. The Sendai virus administration in the form of nasal drops in doses ranging from 5 × 10^{5} 50% embryo infectious dose (EID50) to 5 × 10^{7} EID50 induced the production of neutralizing antibodies to the human virus without any measurable side effects. The results of these trials represent additional evidence of Sendai virus safety for humans. The development of T cell-based AIDS vaccines using Sendai virus vectors reached phase II clinical trial. Evaluation of the safety and immunogenicity of an intranasally administered replication-competent Sendai virus–vectored HIV Type 1 gag vaccine demonstrated: induction of potent T-cell and antibody responses in prime-boost regimens. Sendai virus also used as a backbone for vaccine against respiratory syncytial virus (RSV).

=== Model cancers ===
For cancer studies, it is desirable that the oncolytic virus be non-pathogenic for experimental animals, but the Sendai virus can cause rodent disease, which is a problem for research strategies. Two approaches have been used to overcome this problem and make Sendai virus non-pathogenic for mice and rats. One of these approaches included the creation of a set of genetically modified attenuated viral strains. Representatives of this set were tested on model animals carrying a wide range of transplantable human tumors. It has been shown that they can cause suppression or even eradication of fibrosarcoma, neuroblastoma, hepatocellular carcinoma, melanoma, squamous cell and prostate carcinomas. SeV construct suppresses micrometastasis of head and neck squamous cell carcinoma in an orthotopic nude mouse model. Complete eradication of established gliosarcomas in immunocompetent rats has also been observed. SeV constructs have also been created with a modified protease cleavage site in the F-protein. The modification allowed the recombinant virus to specifically infect cancer cells that expressed the corresponding proteases.

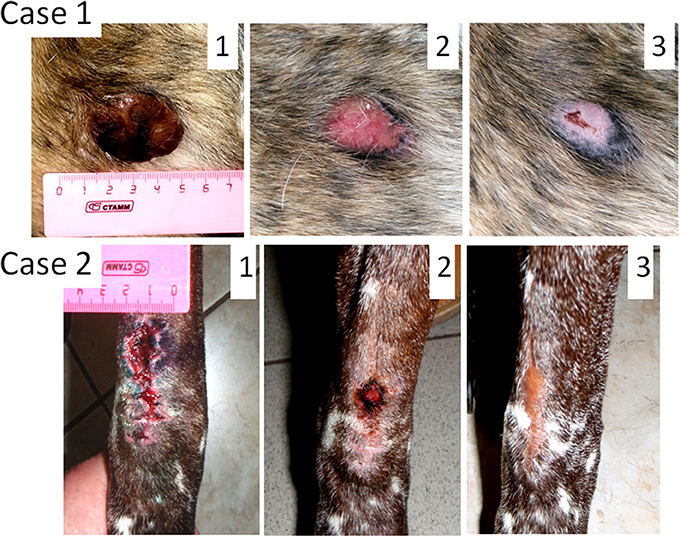
Canine mast cell tumors treated with oncolytic Sendai virus. Case 1. Male dog of 7 years old developed cutaneous, ulcerated, and poorly differentiated mastocytoma (35 mm diameter) located close to his anus. (1) Primary tumor; (2) 2 weeks after the first virus treatment; (3) 4 weeks after the first virus treatment. Case 2. Male German shorthaired pointer of 9 years old developed subcutaneous, regional (stage 2) intermediately differentiated mastocytoma. The primary tumor was removed without clean margins. (1) secondary growth 1 week after the surgical procedure; (2) 2 weeks after the first virus treatment; (3) 5 weeks after the first virus treatment.

Another approach of making Sendai virus non-pathogenic included the short-term treatment of the virions with ultraviolet light. Such treatment causes a loss of the virus replication ability. However, even this replication-deficient virus can induce the cancer cells death and stimulate anti-tumor immunity. It can trigger extensive apoptosis of human glioblastoma cells in culture, and it can efficiently suppress the growth of these cells in model animals. The ultraviolet light treated virus can also kill human prostate cancer cells in culture by triggering their apoptosis and eradicate tumors that originated from these cells in immunodeficient model animals. Moreover, it can stimulate immunomodulated tumor regression of colon and kidney cancers in immunocompetent mice. Similar regressions caused by the replication-deficient Sendai virus have been observed in animals with transplanted melanoma tumors.

=== Natural cancers ===
Some cancer studies with non-rodent animals have been performed with the unmodified Sendai virus. Thus, after intratumoral injections of the virus, complete or partial remission of mast cell tumors (mastocytomas) was observed in dogs affected by this disease. Short-term remission after an intravenous injection of SeV was described in a patient with acute leukemia treated in the Clinical Research Center of University Hospitals of Cleveland (US) by multiple viruses in 1964. It is also reported that the Moscow strain of SeV was tested by V. Senin and his team as an anticancer agent in a few dozen patients affected by various malignancies with metastatic growth in Russia in the 1990s. The virus was injected intradermally or intratumorally and it caused fever in less than half of the treated patients, which usually disappeared within 24 hours. Occasionally, the virus administration caused inflammation of the primary tumor and metastases. Clinical outcomes were variable. A small proportion of treated patients experienced pronounced long-term remission with the disappearance of primary tumors and metastases. Sometimes the remission lasted 5–10 years or more after virotherapy. Brief descriptions of the medical records of the patients that experiences long-term remission are presented in the patent. Intratumoral injection of UV irradiated and inactivated SeV resulted in an antitumor effect in a few melanoma patients with stage IIIC or IV progressive disease with skin or lymph metastasis. Complete or partial responses were observed in approximately half of injected and noninjected target lesions.

=== Anticancer mechanism ===
==== Direct killing of cancer cells ====
Malignant cells are vulnerable to SeV infection. Sendai virus can infect and kill variable cancer cells (see section Sensitive cell lines and virus strains). However, some malignant cells are resistant to SeV infection. There are multiple explanations for such resistance. Not all cancer cells have cell entry receptors for the virus and not all cancer cells express virus processing serine proteases. There are also other mechanisms that can make a cancer cell resistant to an oncolytic virus. For example, some cancer cells maintain interferon response system that completely or partially protects a host cells from a virus infection. Therefore, biomarkers needed to be developed to identify tumors that might succumb to SeV mediated oncolysis.

===== Sendai virus cell entry receptor overexpression =====
Sendai virus cell entry receptors are often overexpressed in cancer cells. SeV receptors are potential biomarkers for evaluation of the vulnerability of malignant cells to the virus. They represented by glycoproteins and glycolipids (see section "SeV cell entry receptors").The expression of some molecules that can facilitate SeV cell entry (see section "SeV cell entry receptors"), frequently, accelerates carcinogenesis or metastasis development. For example, the presence of Sialyl-Lewis^{x} antigen (cluster of differentiation 15s (CD15s)), which is one of SeV cell entry receptors, on the outer cell membrane, correlates with invasion potential of malignant cells, tumor recurrence, and overall patient survival for an extremely wide range of cancers. Therefore, SeV virus preferentially can enter such cells.

Metastatic cancer cells frequently express a high density of glycoproteins or glycolipids – molecules that are rich in sialic acid. Expression of the Vim2 antigen, which is another SeV cell entry receptor, is very important for the extravascular infiltration process of acute myeloid leukemia cells. GD1a, ganglioside also serves as SeV receptor and is found in large quantities on the surfaces of breast cancer stem cells. High cell surface expression of another SeV receptor – ganglioside sialosylparagloboside /SPG/ NeuAcα2-3PG. characterizes lymphoid leukemia cells. Among other receptors represented by gangliosides GT1b is highly expressed on the outer membranes of brain metastases cells that originate from an extremely broad range of cancer, while GD1a, GT1b and GQ1b can be detected in human gliosarcomas. However, their quantity is not exceeding the quantity in normal frontal cerebral cortex. The asialoglycoprotein receptors that bind Sendai virus. and serve as SeV cell entry receptors are highly expressed in liver cancers.

Receptors for SeV and their Expression in Malignancies
Receptor	Malignancy/effect of receptor expression	Reference	Monoclonal AB availability
Human asialoglyco-protein receptor 1 (ASFR1, ASGR1)	High expression in liver cancer and occasionally moderate expression in gliomas, renal, pancreatic, colorectal, and ovarian cancers		Two variants
Sialyl-Lewis^{x} antigen (sLeX/CD15s)	Non-small cell lung cancer/enhances post-operative recurrence		Many variants
Sialyl-Lewis^{x} antigen (sLeX/CD15s)	Glioma cells, high grade glioma		Many variants
Sialyl-Lewis^{x} antigen (sLeX/CD15s)	Tumor-initiating cells in glioblastoma		Many variants
Sialyl-Lewis^{x} antigen (sLeX/CD15s)	Glioblastoma, astrocytoma, ependymoma		Many variants
Sialyl-Lewis^{x} antigen (sLeX/CD15s)	Malignant glio-neuronal tumors		Many variants
Sialyl-Lewis^{x} antigen (sLeX/CD15s)	Medulloblastomas		Many variants
Sialyl-Lewis^{x} antigen (sLeX/CD15s)	Lung cancer, distant metastases		Many variants
Sialyl-Lewis^{x} antigen (sLeX/CD15s)	Colorectal cancer/promotes liver metastases, decreases time of disease-free survival		Many variants
Sialyl-Lewis^{x} antigen (sLeX/CD15s)	Gastric cancers/decreases patient survival time		Many variants
Sialyl-Lewis^{x} antigen (sLeX/CD15s)	Breast cancer/decreases patient survival time		Many variants
Sialyl-Lewis^{x} antigen (sLeX/CD15s)	Prostate tumor/promotes bone metastases		Many variants
Sialyl-Lewis^{x} antigen (sLeX/CD15s)	Cell lines of variable origin/high expression enhances adhesion of malignant cells to vascular endothelium		Many variants
Sialyl-Lewis^{x} antigen (sLeX/CD15s)	Variable cancers/high expression related to lymphatic invasion, venous invasion, T stage, N stage, M stage, tumor stage, recurrence, and overall patient survival	Review	Many variants
VIM-2 antigen (CD65s)	Acute myeloblastic leukemias		Many variants
GD1a	Breast cancer stem cells		Many variants
GD1a	Glioma, glioblastoma		Many variants
GD1a	Castration resistant prostate cancer cells		Many variants
GT1b	Brain metastases from colon, renal, lung, esophagus, pancreas, and mammary carcinomas		Many variants
SPG	Castration resistant prostate cancer cells		One variant
SPG	Lymphoid leukemia cells		One variant

Cellular expression of glycoproteins can be evaluated by various molecular biology methods, which include RNA and protein measurements. However, cellular expression of gangliosides, which are sialic acid-containing glycosphingolipids, cannot be evaluated by these methods. Instead, it can be measured using anti-glycan antibodies, and despite the large collection of such antibodies in a community resource database, they are not always available for each ganglioside. Therefore, indirect measurement of ganglioside expression by quantifying the levels of fucosyltransferases and glycosyltransferases that complete glycan synthesis is an alternative. There is evidence that expression of these enzymes and the production of gangliosides strongly correlate. At least four representatives of fucosyltransferases and several glycosyltransferases including sialyltransferases are responsible for the synthesis of gangliosides that can serve as SeV receptors. All these proteins are often overexpressed in various tumors, and their expression levels correlate with the metastatic status of the tumor and the shorter life span of the patients. Thus, these enzymes are also potential biomarkers of SeV-oncolytic infectivity.

Synthesizing enzymes for SeV cell entry receptors
SeV receptor	Type of enzyme	Enzyme
Sialyl-Lewis^{x} antigen/(sLeX/CD15s)	Fucosyltransferase	FUT3, FUT5, FUT6, FUT7
Sialyl-Lewis^{x} antigen/(sLeX/CD15s)	Glycosyltransferase (Sialyltransferase)	ST3GAL3, ST3GAL4, ST3GAL6
Vim2 antigen /(CD65)	Fucosyltransferase	FUT5
GD1a	Glycosyltransferases (Sialyltransferase)	ST3GAL1, ST3GAL2, ST6GALNAC5 ST6GALNAC6
GD1b, (GT1a, GQ1b and GP1c)	Glycosyltransferases (Sialyltransferase)	ST3GAL2/ ST3GAL3
GT1b	Glycosyltransferases (Sialyltransferase)	ST3GAL2,
Sialosylparagloboside (SPG).	Glycosyltransferases (Sialyltransferase)	ST3GAL6,

===== Proteolytic processing enzyme overexpression =====
Sendai virus proteolytic processing enzymes are often overexpressed in cancer cells. The fusion protein (F) of SeV is synthesized as an inactive precursor and is activated by proteolytic cleavage of the host cell serine proteases (see the section "Proteolytic cleavage by cellular proteases" below). Some of these proteases are overexpressed in malignant neoplasms. For example, transmembrane serine protease 2 (TMPRSS2), which is an F-protein-processing enzyme, is often overexpressed in prostate cancer cells. It is also overexpressed in some cell lines originating from various malignant neoplasms. Thus, it is highly expressed in bladder carcinoma, human colon carcinoma CaCo2 and breast carcinomas SK-BR-3, MCF7 and T-47d. TMPRSS2 is overexpressed in cervical and endocervical squamous cell carcinomas, along with colon, prostate, and rectum adenocarcinomas. It is also overexpressed in uterine corpus endometrial and uterine carcinosarcomas. Another F-protein-protease is tryptase beta 2 (TPSB2). This protease (with alias such as tryptase-Clara and mast cell tryptase) is expressed in normal club cells and mast cells, and in some cancers. Its especially high expression is observed in the human mast cell line HMC-1, and in the human erythroleukemia cell line HEL. The release of this tryptase from mast cells enhances tumor cell metastasis. Another serine protease that cleaves F0 is HAT/TMPRSS11D. TMPRSS11D expression is altered in several cancers, with effects that appear tissue-dependent. In non-small cell lung cancer, both mRNA and protein levels of TMPRSS11D are elevated in tumor tissue compared with adjacent normal tissue, and high protein expression is an independent predictor of poorer overall survival. Plasminogen (PLG), from which originates the mini-plasmin that can cleave the F-protein, is highly expressed in liver cancers. Its expression is also increased in a wide range of other malignant neoplasms. Factor X (F10) is frequently expressed in normal liver and in liver cancers. SeV constructs were created with a modified protease cleavage site. The modification allowed the recombinant virus to specifically infect cancer cells that expressed the corresponding proteases, which can cleave a modified protease cleavage site.

===== Defects in the interferon system =====
The interferon production and response system often malfunctions in malignant cells; therefore, they are much more vulnerable to infection with oncolytic viruses compared to normal cells Thus, cells belonging to three human cell lines, originated from variable malignancies, such as U937, Namalwa, and A549, retain their ability to become infected with SeV even after treatment with type 1 IFN. Interferon response system is broken in these cells and it cannot protect them from SeV infection.

In Namalwa cells SeV virus stimulates an expression of many genes involved in immune defense pathways, such as type I and type II IFN signaling, as well as cytokine signaling. Among the ten most virus-induced mRNAs are IFNα8, IFNα13, IFNβ, IFNλ: (L28α, IL28β, IL29), OASL, CXCL10, CXCL11 and HERC5. However, despite stimulation of these genes expression by SeV, Namalwa cells cannot protect themselves from the virus infection.

===== Inhibiting interferon response in some cancer cells =====
In HeLa cells SeV (in contrast to vesicular stomatitis virus) can counteract IFN-α pretreatment and keep a viral protein translation level similar to that in IFN-untreated cells.

===== Activation of a necroptotic pathway in malignant cells =====
It has been shown, using fibrosarcoma cell line L929, that SeV is able to induce malignant cell death through necroptosis. This type of cell death is highly immunogenic because dying necroptotic cells release damage-associated molecular pattern (DAMPs) molecules, which initiate adaptive immunity. The necroptotic pathway, triggered by SeV, requires RIG-I activation and the presence of SeV encoded proteins Y1 and/or Y2.

===== Removing sialic acid residues from T-regulatory cell surfaces =====
Viral neuraminidase has the ability to remove sialic acid residues from cell surfaces, including those on T-regulatory (Treg) cells. Research indicates that the Sialyl-Lewis x antigen is specifically found in activated, terminally differentiated, and highly suppressive CD4+ regulatory T (Treg) cells, which can be distinguished from nonsuppressive T cell. Removing the suppressive Treg cells from human blood has been shown to enhance immune responses against tumor and viral antigens in vitro. Removing the Sialyl-Lewis x antigen from Treg cells can inactivate their suppressive function.

===== Virus-mediated fusion of cancer cells =====
The host organism fights viral infection using various strategies. One such strategy is the production of neutralizing antibodies. In response to this production, viruses have developed their own strategies for spreading the infection and avoiding the inactivation by the host produced neutralizing antibodies. Some viruses, and in particular paramyxoviruses, can produce new virus particles by fusing infected and healthy host cells. This fusion leads to the formation of a large multi-nuclear structure (syncytium). Sendai virus, as a representative of Paramyxoviridae, uses this strategy to spread its infection (see the section "Directed cell fusion" below). The virus can fuse up to 50–100 cells adjacent to one primary infected cell. This multi-nuclear formation, derived from several dozens of cells, survives for several days and subsequently releases functional viral particles.

It has been demonstrated that the ability of a virus to destroy tumor cells increases along with an increase in the ability of the virus to form large multi-nuclear structures. The transfer of genes that are responsible for the formation of syncytium from the representative of Paramyxoviridae to the representatives of Rhabdoviridae or Herpesviridae makes the recipient viruses more oncolytic. Moreover, the oncolytic potential of paramyxovirus can be enhanced by mutations in the fusion (F) gene protease-cleavage site, which allows the F-protein to be more efficiently processed by cellular proteases. The introduction of the F gene of SeV in the form of a plasmid into the tumor tissue in mice by electroporation showed that the expression of the F gene increases the T cell infiltration of the tumor with CD4+ and CD8+ cells and inhibits tumor growth. It was also shown in other similar experiments that cancer cells themselves, transfected with plasmids that encode viral membrane glycoproteins with fusion function, cause the collective death of neighboring cells forming syncytium with them. Recruitment of bystander cells into the syncytium leads to significant regression of the tumor.

==== Killing of malignant cells by virus triggered anti-tumor immunity ====
The virus triggers indirect immunomodulated death of malignant cells using a number of mechanisms, which are described in a published review. The viral enzyme neuraminidase (NA), which has sialidase activity, can make cancer cells more visible to the immune system by removing natural killer cells (NK), cytotoxic T lymphocytes (CTL) and dendritic cells (DC). The secretion of interleukin-6, that is triggered by the virus, also inhibits regulatory T cells.

===== Stimulation of the secretion of cytokines =====
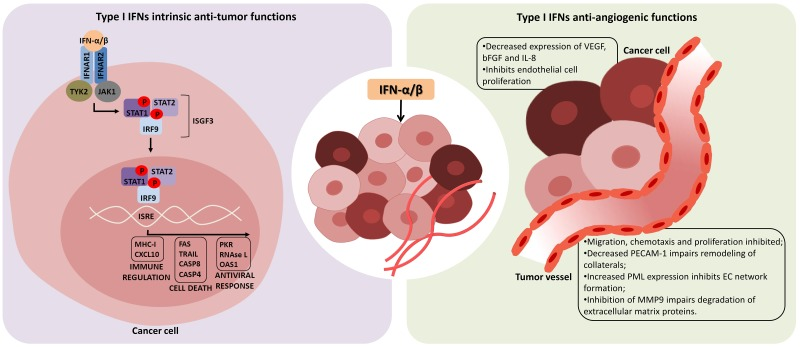
Intrinsic anti-tumor and anti-angiogenic functions of type I interferons

====== Interferons ======
Type I and type II interferons have anticancer activity (see the "Function" section in the "Interferon" article). Interferons can promote expression of major histocompatibility complex molecules, MHC I and MHC II, and stimulate immunoproteasome activity. All interferons drastically increase the presentation of MHC I dependent antigens. Interferon gamma (IFN-gamma) also strongly promotes the MHC II-dependent presentation of antigens. Higher MHC I expression leads to higher presentation of viral and abnormal peptides from cancer cells to cytotoxic T cells, while the immunoproteasome more efficiently processes these peptides for loading onto the MHC I molecule. Therefore, the recognition and killing of infected or malignant cells increases. Higher MHC II expression enhances presentation of viral and cancer peptides to helper T cells; which are releasing cytokines (such as more interferons, interleukins and other cytokines) that stimulate and co-ordinate the activity of other immune cells.

By down regulation of angiogenic stimuli produced by tumor cells interferon can also suppress angiogenesis In addition, they suppress the proliferation of endothelial cells. Such suppression causes a decrease in tumor vascularization and subsequent growth inhibition. Interferons can directly activate immune cells including macrophages and natural killer cells. INF-1 and interferon gamma (IFN-γ) production are triggered by SeV molecular components in many cells (See "Virus-induced antiviral immunity" section above). It has been demonstrated that SeV can also induce the production of IFN type III (IFN-lambda) by human plasmacytoid dendritic cells.

====== Non-interferons ======
Sendai virus can induce the production of many cytokines that enhance cellular immune responses against cancer cells. SeV stimulates the production of macrophage inflammatory protein-1α (MIB-1α) and –β (MIB-1β), RANTES (CCL5), tumor necrosis factor-alpha (TNF-alpha), tumor necrosis factor-beta (TNF-beta), interleukin-6 (IL-6), interleukin-8 (IL-8), interleukin-1 alpha (IL1A), interleukin-1 beta (IL1B), platelet-derived growth factor (PDGF-AB) and small concentrations of interleukin-2 (IL2) and GM-CSF. The virus can trigger production of interleukin 12 (IL12) and interleukin 23 (IL23) in human macrophages. Even plasmids that deliver the F-coding gene of SeV to tumor cells in model animals trigger the production of RANTES (CCL5) in tumor-infiltrated T-lymphocytes. SeV induces the production of B cell-activating factor by monocytes and by some other cells.

Heat-inactivated SeV virus induces the production of IL-10 and IL-6 cytokines by dendritic cells (DC). Most likely, F protein is responsible for this induction because reconstituted liposomes containing F protein can stimulate IL-6 production by DC. The production of IL-6 in response to SeV infection is restricted to conventional dendritic cells (DCs) subsets, such as CD4^{+} and double negative (dnDC).

The UV-inactivated SeV (and likely the alive virus as well) can stimulate dendritic cells to secrete chemokines and cytokines such as interleukin-6, interferon-beta, chemokine (C-C motif) ligand 5, and chemokine (C-X-C motif) ligand 10. These molecules activate both CD8^{+} T cells as well as natural killer cells and attract them to the tumor. It has been shown that in cancer cell lines, UV-inactivated SeV triggers the production of an which is a macrophage-1 antigen (Mac-1) and Mac-1 and LFA-1 are receptors found on leukocytes. This induced production happens through the activation of nuclear factor-κB downstream of the mitochondrial antiviral signaling pathway and the retinoic acid-inducible gene I. The increased concentration of ICAM-1 on the surface of cancer cells, which is triggered by SeV, increases the vulnerability of these cells to natural killer cells.

===== Neuraminidase (NA) removal of sialic acid =====
Neuraminidase (NA) removal of cytotoxic T lymphocytes from the surface of malignant cells stimulates natural killer cells and cytotoxic T lymphocytes. Increased sialylation levels on the cell membrane have been linked to a heightened potential for invasion and metastasis in cancer cells. This correlation has been observed across various models, including murine, rat, and human, and is associated with the progression of malignancy. Some sialylation inhibitors can make cancer cells less malignant.

One possible explanation for the relationship between increased sialylation and a malignant phenotype is that sialylation results in a thick layer of coating on the cell membrane that masks cancer antigens and protects malignant cells from immune surveillance. The activity and cytotoxicity of NK cells is inhibited by the expression of sialic acids on the tumor cell surface. Removal of sialic acid residues from the surface of tumor cells makes them available to NK cells and cytotoxic T lymphocytes and, therefore, reduces their growth potential. Moreover, treating tumor cells with sialidase improves activation of NK cell secretion of IFN-γ.

Some paramyxoviruses, including SeV encode and synthesize neuraminidase (sialidase), which can remove sialic acid residues from the surface of malignant cells. Hemagglutinin-neuraminidase (HN) is a single protein that induces hemagglutination and possesses neuraminidase (sialidase) activity. Neuraminidase (NA), a subunit of the HN protein, binds to and cleaves sialic acid from the cell surface. NA also promotes cell fusion, which helps the nascent virions to avoid contact with host antibodies and thus enables the virus to spread within tissues.

cytotoxic T lymphocytes. Variable sialidases can cause this effect, including NA from Newcastle disease virus that have been shown to cleave 2,3-, 2,6-, and 2,8-linkages between sialic acid residues. In vitro, there was no significant difference between NAs from Newcastle disease virus, SeV and mumps virus with respect to substrate specificity. These results suggest that treating a tumor with the virus results in desialylation of malignant cells, which contributes to increased anti-tumor immune surveillance. Therefore, the ability of SeV sialidase (NA) to remove sialic acid from the surface of malignant cells most likely helps to ensure the availability of tumor antigens for recognition by cytotoxic T lymphocytes.

===== Stimulation of natural killer (NK) cells =====
Experiments with UV-inactivated SeV showed that NK cells are important in virus-mediated inhibition of tumor growth. This was shown in a mouse model of renal cancer, in which the anti-tumor effect of SeV was suppressed by reducing the number of NK cells by co-injection of specific antibodies.

The activation of NK requires several receptors, among which are natural killer proteins 46 (NKp46) and 44 (NKp44). Studies have shown that the only paramyxovirus protein that activates NK is HN. HN protein binding to NKp46 and/or NKp44 results in the lysis of cells whose surfaces display the HN protein or its fragments. It can be assumed that NK activation and tumor suppression by UV-treated SeV are caused by interaction between HN belonging to SeV, and NKp46 and/or NKp44 receptors belonging to NK cells.

===== Induction of anti-tumor cytotoxicity of cytotoxic T cells =====
SeV even after UV inactivation, being injected intratumorally, can cause tumor infiltration by dendritic cells (DCs) and CD4+ and CD8+ T, and it also can cause enhancing of anti-tumor activity of these cells. Most likely, viral hemagglutinin-neuraminidase protein, highly contributes to the effect (see "'Neuraminidase (NA) removal of sialic acid" section above). This hypothesis is based on two observations. First, the functional hemagglutinin-neuraminidase protein of the oncolytic Newcastle disease virus (NDV), which is a relative of SeV, has been shown to enhance the tumor-specific cytotoxic response of CD8+ T-cells and to increase the activity of CD4+ T-helper cells. Second, UV-inactivated NDV, which is can not replicate, promotes anti-tumor CTL response as well as does intact NDV, which can replicate. Since the hemagglutinin-neuraminidase proteins of the SeV and NDV viruses are highly homologous and function similarly, it is likely that the HN protein of the SeV virus can activate both CTL and natural killers cell responses. Most likely neuraminidase removal of sialic acid from the surface of malignant cells contributes to this effects.

===== SeV stimulation of dendritic cells =====
UV-inactivated SeV can cause dendritic cells (DCs) to maturate and to infiltrate a tumor. Ex vivo infection of DCs with recombinant non-transmissible SeV induces maturation and activation of DCs within 60 minutes. When activated DCs that carry non-transmissible variants of SeV are administered, survival of animals injected with melanoma, colorectal cancer, squamous cell carcinoma, hepatic cancer, neuroblastoma, and prostate cancer is significantly improved. It has been shown that the administration of such DCs prior to tumor cell injection prevents metastasis of neuroblastoma and prostate adenocarcinoma to the lungs.

The enzymatic removal of sialic acids from the surface of dendritic cells by sialidase significantly promote the antigen-induced activation of naive T cells, while concurrently enhancing the resurgence of effector T cells. It is plausible that sialidase from Sendai virus (SeV) could execute this function. The removal not only improves antigen cross-presentation but boosts anti-tumor immune responses as well. Dendritic cells with reduced sialylation form higher avidity interactions with CD8+ T cells.

SeV can replicate to high titers in human monocyte-derived DCs. With the multiplicity of infection of 2, approximately 1/3 of the DCs begin to express encoded SeV proteins 8 hours after infection. This proportion increases to 2/3, 24 hours and decreases to 1/3, 48 hours after infection. SeV demonstrates high cytopathic effect on DCs; the virus can kill a third of DC even with a very low multiplicity of infection such as 0.5. Most important observation is that SeV infection triggers DC maturation, which is manifested in DC cell surface markers composition. The virus increases the expression of class I and class II molecules of the major histocompatibility complex (MHC) (HLA-A, HLA-B, HLA-C and HLADR), CD83, as well as costimulatory molecules CD40 and CD86.

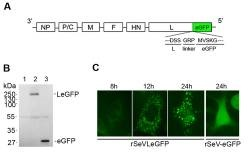
Schematic diagram of Sendai Virus genome with Green Fluorescent Protein (GFP). (A) The recombinant virus genome expresses eGFP (239 residues) fused to the C-terminus of the L protein (2,228 residues). (B) Western blot analysis of GFP expressed in infected cells. Lysates of mock- (lane 1), recombinant virus genomes (lane 2 and lane 3) infected cells were reacted with anti-GFP antibody. (C) Analysis of construct localization in live cells. HeLa cells were infected with recombinant genomes and images of the cells were captured at the indicated hours post infection.

===== SeV suppression of regulatory T cells =====
Experiments with animal models have shown that, even after UV inactivation, SeV can block T-cell-mediated regulatory immunosuppression in tumors. The blocking mechanism is associated with the stimulation of SeV inactivated virions of interleukin 6 (IL-6) secretion by mature DCs. These effects lead to the eradication of most model tumors and inhibit the growth of the rest. It has been shown that F protein alone can trigger IL-6 production in DC in a fusion-independent manner.

== As a vector ==
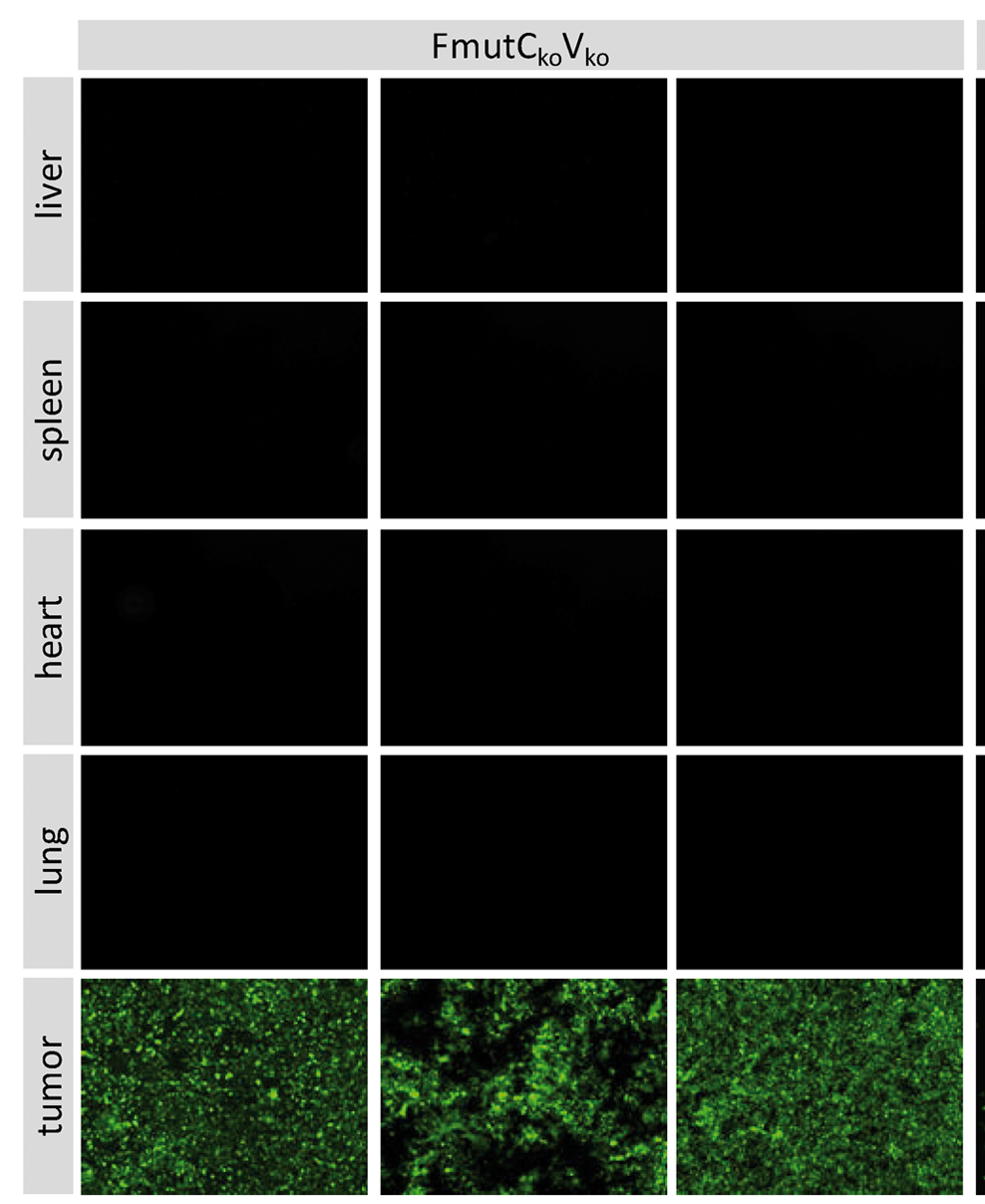
SeV construct with a modified protease cleavage site in its fusion protein (F) gene was created. The image shows intratumoral and intra-organ spread of recombinant virions in vivo in a murine model of hepatoma which has been xenografted.

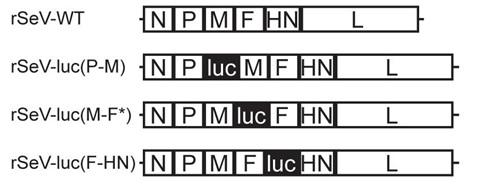
Sendai virus constructs that express luciferase. Upstream insertion of luciferase in rSeV-luc (P-M) resulted in greater luciferase activity than downstream insertion in rSeV-luc (F-HN).

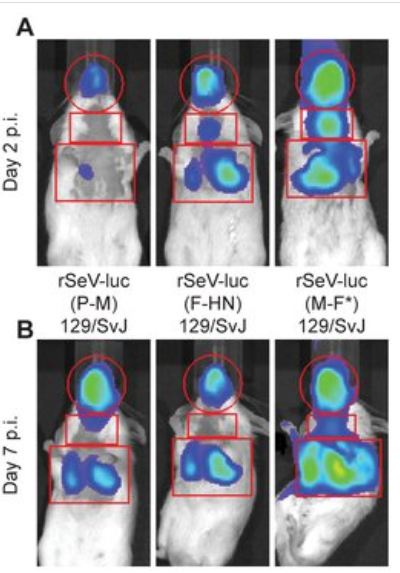
Non-invasive bioluminescence imaging of Sendai virus infection in the respiratory tracts of living mice

SeV has been known to the research community since the late 1950s and has been widely used to create numerous variants of genetically engineered constructs, including vectors for transgene delivery. Creation of SeV genetic constructs is easier compared to other viruses, many SeV genes have a transcriptional initiation and termination signals. Therefore, constructing a recombinant virus is straightforward; the foreign gene can be introduced into the viral genome by replacing or adding viral protein expressing gene(s). SeV can include a foreign gene or even multiple genes of large size. It has been demonstrated that a gene of more than 3 kb can be inserted and expressed in SeV. Due to exclusively cytoplasmic replication, the virus does not carry the risk of genetic integration into the host genomes, which is a problem for many other viral vectors. The genome of SeV as genomes of other non segmented negative-stranded RNA viruses has a low rate of homologous recombination and evolves comparatively slowly. Multiple reasons for this genomic stability exist: (1) the genome is nonsegmented, therefore cannot undergo genetic reassortment, (2) each protein and each amino acid has an important function. Therefore, any new genetic insertion, substitution or deletion would lead to a decrease or total loss of function that would in turn cause the new virus variant to be less viable. (3) Sendai virus belongs to a category of viruses that are governed by the "rule of six". SeV genome as genomes of other paramyxoviruses mainly include six genes, which encode for six major proteins. Low rate of homologous RNA recombination in paramyxoviruses probably results from this unusual genomic requirement for polyhexameric length (6n+0). Natural high genomic stability of SeV is a positive feature for it potential use as a vaccine vector or as an oncolytic agent. For any clinical or industrial applications, it is important that SeV genomic and inserted foreign genes would be expressed in a stable way. Due to SeV genetic stability, multiple serial passages of the virus construct in cell cultures or embryonated chicken eggs without drastic genomic changes are possible. SeV constructs are known to stably express a wide variety of heterologous antigens.

=== Reverse genetic system ===
The reverse genetics system to rescue Sendai virus was created and published in 1995. Since then a number of modifications and improvements were described for representatives of Mononegavirales, Paramyxoviridae in general, and for Sendai virus in particular. The entire length of the vector SeV genome, including transgenes, has to be arranged in multiples of six nucleotides (the so-called "rule of six").

Trafficking of nucleocapsids is mediated by intracellular vesicles

=== Genes addition, deletion and modification ===
Recombinant SeV variants has been constructed by introducing new genes and/or by deleting some viral genes such as F, M, and HN from the SeV genome. Reporter genes, such as those that are coding luciferase, green or red fluorescent proteins can be inserted in different locations in the viral genome. These locations include positions upstream of the N gene, between the N and P genes, between P and M, M and F, F and HN, HN and L, and after the L gene.

SeV constructs have also been created with a modified protease cleavage site in fusion protein (F). The SeV F protein is a type I membrane glycoprotein that is synthesized as an inactive precursor (F_{0}) that must be activated by proteolytic cleavage at residue arginine-116. After the cleavage F_{0} precursor yields two disulfide-linked subunits F_{1} and F_{2}. The proteolytic cleavage site can be changed, so other host proteases would be capable to process F_{0}.

Sendai virus based vector system that can deliver CRISPR/Cas9 for efficient gene editing was created.

=== Non-invasive imaging ===
A variety of Sendai virus constructs carrying reporter genes were developed for non-invasive imaging of the virus infection in animals. They allow to study dynamics of SeV spread and clearance. Some of these constructs were designed to deliver luciferase genes, some to deliver green fluorescent protein (GFP), others to deliver red fluorescent protein (RFP).

=== Sendai virus minigenome ===
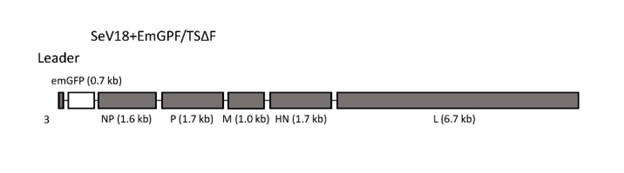
Sendai Virus minigenome with emerald-green protein

The Sendai virus minigenome is a shortened version of its viral genome, in which some portions of the coding sequences of the virus have been removed. The removed genes can be replaced with a foreign transgene of interest. The minigenome can be multiplied in cells expressing a minimal set of complementary viral proteins or infected with a homologous wild-type helper virus. Sendai virus minigenomes are used to produce recombinant proteins of interest, and in a vector system to reprogram cells into pluripotent stem cells (iPSCs). A Sendai virus minigenome lacking fusion protein but expressing emerald green fluorescent protein (EmGFP) as a reporter was found to be an efficient gene delivery vector in several human pancreatic cancer cells.

=== Insertion of transgenes ===
To integrate a gene fragment of interest into the Sendai virus genome, the following protocol might be used.

The amplified gene fragment is inserted into a Sendai virus vector lacking the F protein (SeV/ΔF). The recovery and amplification of SeV/ΔF vectors proceed as follows:

- Transfection: 293T cells are transfected with the pSeV/ΔF template containing the transgene of interest, along with plasmids that encode the T7 RNA polymerase and the viral genes NP, P, F5R (a modified F protein), and L.
- Cultivation: Post-transfection, the cells are incubated and cultured for 1 to 3 days to produce the initial SeV/ΔF vector.
- Propagation: The vector is then propagated in LLC-MK2/F7/A cells, a specialized cell line of LLC-MK2 that expresses the Sendai virus F protein, in a medium that includes trypsin.
- Titer quantification: The titers of the harvested SeV vector are determined by measuring the cell infectious units (CIU) per milliliter through immunostaining with anti-SeV rabbit polyclonal serum.

=== Production of foreign soluble glycoproteins using allantoic fluid expression system ===
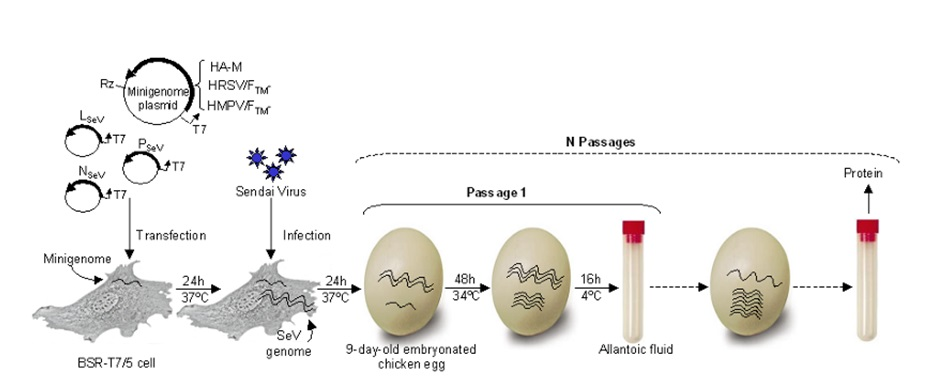
Large scale production of foreign soluble glycoproteins in allantoic fluid using Sendai Virus minigenome expression system

Researchers have developed a method to efficiently produce substantial quantities of heterologous viral glycoproteins within the allantoic cavity of embryonated chicken eggs. This technique utilizes a Sendai virus minigenome as a vector to express soluble variants of specific proteins, notably the human respiratory syncytial virus (HRSV) and human metapneumovirus (HMPV) fusion (F) proteins. These proteins are engineered without their transmembrane and cytoplasmic domains, facilitating their solubility.

Overview of the methodology:

- Rescue of Sendai virus minigenomes: The process begins with the rescue of Sendai virus minigenomes that encode the target proteins. This step is conducted in cell cultures, assisted by the wild-type Sendai virus, which acts as a helper virus.
- Propagation in embryonated eggs: Subsequently, the engineered viruses are propagated within the allantoic cavity of chicken embryonated eggs. This environment is conducive to the viruses' replication and protein production. To enhance yields, the process may undergo several iterations across different generations of eggs.
- Yield enhancement: Comparative studies have demonstrated that this method yields protein quantities that are 5 to 10 times greater than those produced in cell culture supernatants infected with vaccinia virus recombinants.

=== Reprogramming into iPSCs ===
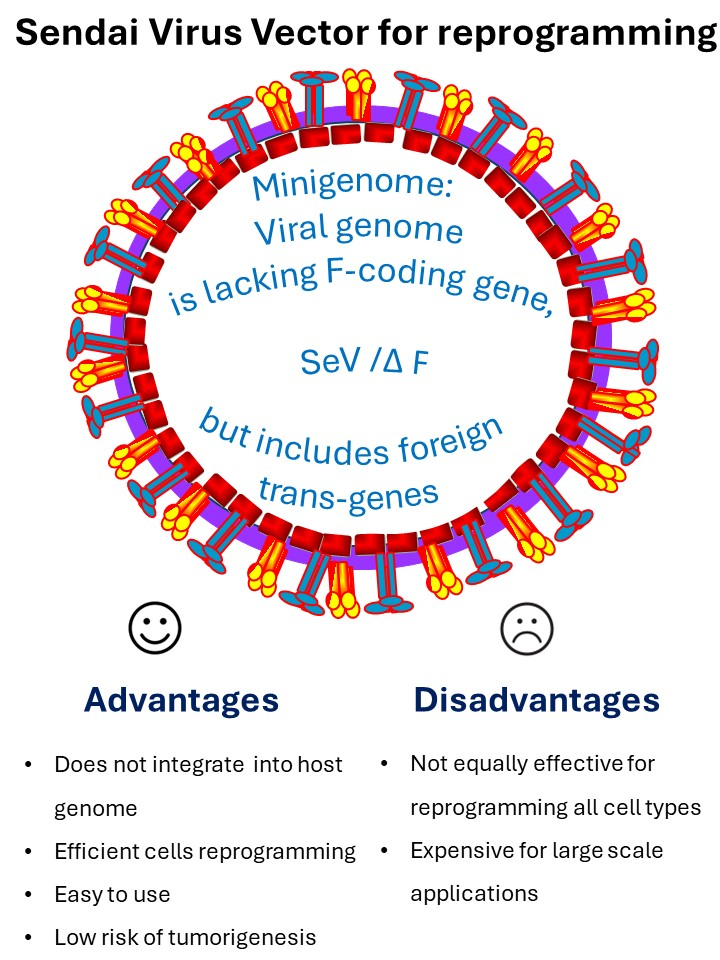
Sendai viral vector platform for reprogramming somatic cells into induced pluripotent stem cells (iPSCs)

One of the latest applications of SeV-based vectors is the reprogramming of somatic cells into induced pluripotent stem cells (iPSCs). The SeV vector with a mutation that is responsible for temperature-sensitive phenotype was created to facilitate the erasure of the vector genome in a cell line. Temperature sensitive mutants of SeV encoding human OCT3/4, SOX2, KLF4 and c-MYC genes are used to infect human donor cells, but the resulting iPSCs became transgene free. One possible source of donor cells are human cord blood-derived hematopoietic stem cells stimulated with cytokines. Among these cells SeV achieves high transgene expression in CD34+ cells subset. Another source—human primary PBMC, according to a technical note of TaKaRa human primary PBMC from donors blood can be directly reprogrammed into iPSC during 21 days period. Patient and healthy donors peripheral blood also can be a source of CD34+ cells subset that can be reprogrammed into iPSC. PBMC derived T cells activated for 5 days with anti-CD3 antibody and IL-2 also can be used for the purpose. In addition, human fibroblasts can be utilized for iPSC creation. The system for such reprogramming is commercially available from ThermoFisher Scientific as CTS CytoTune-iPS 2.1 Sendai Reprogramming Kit, Catalog number: A34546. Deriving naive human iPSCs using Sendai virus vectors presents challenges, but these are gradually being overcome.

=== Airway gene transfer ===
SeV vector is one of the most efficient vectors for airway gene transfer. In its natural hosts, like mice, and non-natural hosts, like sheep, SeV-mediated foreign gene expression can be visualized in lungs. This expression is transient: intensive during a few days after the first SeV administration but is returning to baseline, zero values, by day 14. After the second administration, the expression of transgenes is getting reduced by 60% when compared with levels achieved after a first dose.

=== MicroRNA expression ===
A replication-defective and persistent Sendai virus can be used as a platform for a durable expression of microRNAs, which were able to inhibit expression of targeted genes.

=== For vaccine creation ===
SeV has several features that are important in a vector for a successful vaccine: the virus does not integrate into the host genome, it does not undergo genetic recombination, it replicates only in the cytoplasm without DNA intermediates or a nuclear phase. SeV, as all other representatives of family Paramyxoviridae, is genetically stable and evolves very slowly. SeV genome can accommodate foreign genes in multiple intergenic positions and the SeV genome is suitable for introducing genes encoding the envelope glycoproteins of pathogenic viruses. For vaccination purpose the virus-based constructs could be delivered in a form of nasal drops, which may be beneficial in inducing a mucosal immune response. This form of vaccination is more immunogenic than intramuscular considering pre-existing anti-SeV antibodies. Sendai virus-based constructs can induce durable, mucosal, B-cell, and T-cell immune responses. The virus genome has high similarity with human parainfluenza virus 1 (HPIV-1) and the two viruses share common antigenic determinants. The study that was published in 2011 demonstrated that SeV neutralizing antibodies (which were formed due to human parainfluenza virus type 1 past infection) can be detected in 92.5% of human subjects worldwide with a median EC_{50} titer of 60.6 and values ranging from 5.9–11,324. Low anti-SeV antibodies background does not block the ability of SeV-base vaccine to promote antigen-specific T cell immunity.

==== Human parainfluenza virus 1 (HPV1) ====
Wild type, attenuated SeV has been used in clinical trials involving both adults and children to immunize against HPIV-1.The virus administration in the form of nasal drops in doses ranging from 5 × 10^{5} 50% embryo infectious dose (EID50) to 5 × 10^{7} induced the production of neutralizing antibodies to the human virus without any measurable side effects. The results of these trials represent an evidence of safety for humans of replication competent Sendai virus administration. SeV antibodies that cross-reactive with HPIV-1 antibodies are present in most people, however, majority of people do not have high titer of these antibodies. The study that was published in 2011 demonstrated that SeV neutralizing antibodies (which were formed due to HPIV-1 past infection) can be detected in 92.5% subjects worldwide with a median EC_{50} titer of 60.6 and values ranging from 5.9–11,324. Low anti-SeV antibodies background does not block the ability of SeV-base vaccine to promote antigen-specific T cell immunity.

==== Human immunodeficiency virus type 1 (HIV) ====
The development of T cell-based AIDS vaccines using Sendai virus vectors is taking place reached phase II clinical trial. Evaluation of the safety and immunogenicity of an intranasally administered replication-competent Sendai virus–vectored HIV type 1 gag vaccine demonstrated: induction of potent T-cell and antibody responses in prime-boost regimens.

==== Respiratory syncytial virus (Human orthopneumovirus) ====
Sendai virus was also used as a backbone for vaccine against respiratory syncytial virus (HRSV). This virus (HRSV), is a major cause of lower respiratory tract infections and hospital visits during infancy and childhood. It was shown that administration of SeV-based RSV vaccine protects cotton rats and African green monkeys from this viral infection. The HRSV phase I clinical trial was completed in adults. It demonstrated high safety of the SeV-based construct that expressed HRSV envelope F glycoprotein.

==== Mycobacterium tuberculosis ====
SeV is currently used in preclinical studies as a backbone vector for vaccine against tuberculosis. Mucosal vaccination with SeV construct generates memory CD8 T cell immunity and promotes protection against Mycobacterium tuberculosis in mice.

==== As a vector backbone for COVID-19 vaccine ====
For effective prevention of infections caused by SARS-CoV-2, the ability of the vaccine to stimulate the mucosal immunity of the upper respiratory tract, including the nasal cavity, might be highly important. Such immunity is able to strengthen the antiviral barrier in the upper respiratory tract and provide reliable protection against COVID-19. It has been demonstrated that intranasally administered SeV can elicit strong mucosal immunity. Thus, mucosal vaccination with SeV generates robust IgA and IgG antibodies production by nasal-associated lymphoid tissue and by lungs of cotton rats. These antibodies facilitated rapid protection against human parainfluenza virus-type 1.

In China, Fudan University in collaboration with Pharma Co. Ltd. is engaged in development of the vaccine for COVID-19 prevention. SeV serves as a backbone vector in the project. Researchers from the Fudan University have significant experience working with SeV vectors; they created SeV based vaccine for tuberculosis prevention, which is in pre-clinical testing. There are two Sendai virus strains in China that were described in scientific publications. One of them is BB1 strain, which derived from the Moscow virus strain and has less than 20 non-synomic substitutions compared to Moscow strain. The strain BB1 was given to the researchers of Institute of Viral Disease Control and Prevention, Beijing, China by researchers of Ivanovsky Institute of Virology, Moscow, Russia in the 1960s. Another strain is Tianjin strain, isolated in China in 2008. One of these strains was used for creation of replication deficient SeV85AB construct that is lacking fusion protein (F) but has inserted sequence encoding immunodominant antigen of Mycobacterium tuberculosis. The safety and immunogenicity of this construct was tested in animal models. This construct can be easily transformed into the construct that encodes S-protein of SARS-CoV-2. In Russia, State Research Center of Virology and Biotechnology VECTOR is in developing stage of vaccine against COVID-19 using Moscow strain of Sendai virus as a vector backbone.

In Japan researchers have developed two intranasal vaccine candidates against SARS-CoV-2. One design utilizes a modified Sendai virus (SeV) as a vector to deliver the SARS-CoV-2 spike protein's receptor binding domain (RBD) directly to the respiratory tract. In pre-clinical studies, mice received the vaccine intranasally. Mice demonstrated elevated levels of antibodies specific to the SARS-CoV-2 S-RBD (IgM, IgG, IgA) in both their blood serum and bronchoalveolar lavage fluid, lasting up to 12 weeks. Another design uses a similar F-gene lacking SeV vector but different SARS-CoV-2 antigens. Instead of the S-protein, the vaccine design used SARS-CoV-2 nucleocapsid (N), membrane (M), and envelope (E) proteins as immunogens. The study found strong CD8+ T cell responses against these antigens, suggesting intranasal vaccination can trigger immune cells (CD8+ T cells) that target the virus and help control SARS-CoV-2 infection. Vaccination significantly reduced viral load in nasopharyngeal swabs of macaques on day 2 post-challenge, compared to the unvaccinated control group.

==== Veterinary vaccine ====
Recombinant Sendai virus (rSeV) vectors are currently being developed as a platform for the control and prevention of infectious diseases in animals. While vaccination is a cornerstone of ensuring animal health, food security, and economic stability, many existing veterinary vaccines rely on traditional inactivated or live attenuated formulations that may provide insufficient or short-lived protection. Recombinant SeV vectors offer several biological and practical advantages for addressing these challenges, especially for major pathogens like influenza A, foot-and-mouth disease (FMDV), and animal retroviruses as shown in the table below and described in the literature review.

Research outcomes of SeV-based vaccine prototypes
Pathogen	Key outcomes and "Lessons Learned"
Influenza A	HA-based vectors (GP42-SeV-H1) provide full protection from lethal infection by influenza virus by intranasal immunization of mice, cross-protection was not studied. M2-based vectors (SeV/ΔF/H5N1M2) failed to confer heterologous cross-protection in mice.
Foot-and-mouth disease virus (FMDV)	The rSeV-P1 prototype induced high levels of neutralizing antibodies and Vaccinated mice were able to inhibit the replication of FMDV in the sera after FMDV challenge.
Small ruminant lentivirus (SRLV)	The rSeV-GFP-P25 prototype demonstrated the ability to induce a robust "antiviral state". Research suggests its value lies in viral "burden reduction" through innate immune stimulation rather than total viral clearance.

== Virus biology and properties ==
=== Virion structure ===
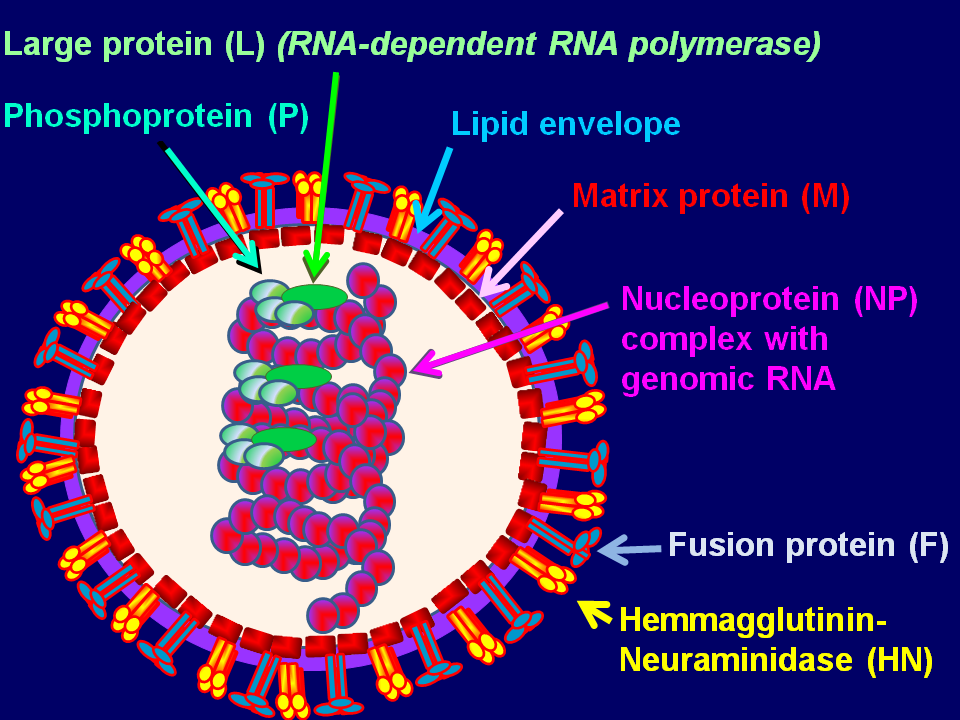
Schematic representation of virion

Virion structure is well described in a published review. Sendai virus is an enveloped virus: its outer layer is a lipid envelope, which contains glycoprotein hemagglutinin-neuraminidase (HN) with two enzymatic activities (hemagglutinating and neuraminidase). Hemagglutinin (H) serves as a cell attachment factor and membrane fusion protein. Neuraminidase (NA) is a sialidase that cleaves and removes sialic acid from the surface of a host cell. This cleavage promotes the fusion of the viral lipid envelope with the cell outer membrane.

In the lipid envelope of the virus located also a fusion protein (F), which is also a glycoprotein that ensures the virus entry into a host cell after viral adsorption. F-protein, as other paramyxoviral fusion proteins, is a trimeric class I viral membrane fusion protein. It is produced in the form of an F0 precursor that must be cleaved by host cell proteases into disulfide-bonded F1 and F2 subunits in order for the trimer to become biologically active. Under the lipid membrane is a matrix protein (M); it forms the inner layer of the virus envelope and stabilizes it structure. The SeV virion also contains the nucleocapsid core, which is composed of the genomic RNA, the nucleocapsid protein (NP), the phosphoproteins (P), which is an essential subunit of the viral of RNA-dependent RNA polymerase (RDRP), and the large protein (L) that is a catalytic subunit of this polymerase. C-protein, which is translated from an alternative reading frame of the P-coding mRNA, is also associated with a viral capsid. It is present in SeV virions at relatively low levels (40 molecules/genome).

=== Genome ===
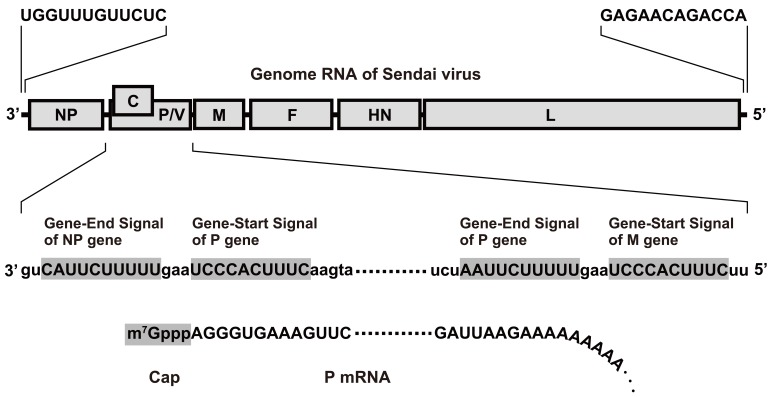
Genome structure of the Sendai virus. Transcription of capped mRNAs starts from the transcription initiation signal with RNA-dependent RNA polymerase (L protein). Transcription ends at the transcription termination signal, followed by a poly-A signal.

==== Structure ====
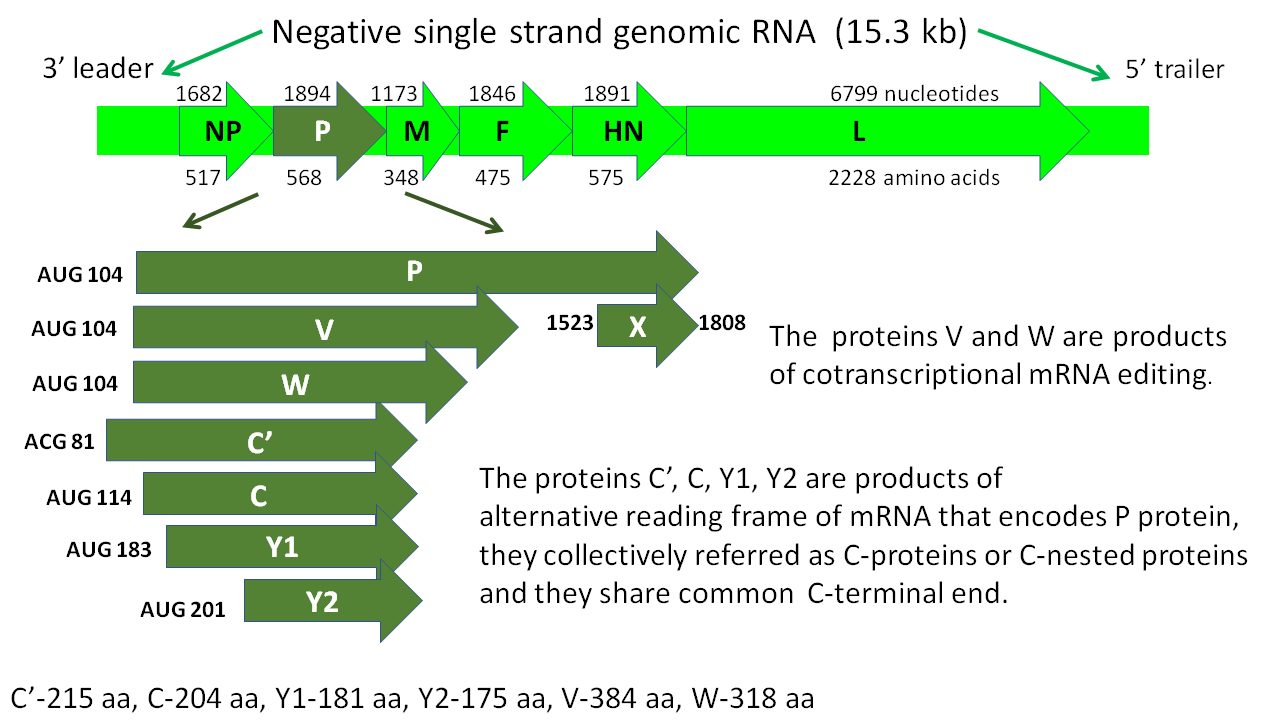
Genome structure The positions of translation initiation sites for products of the alternative reading frame of the P-coding mRNA

The SeV genome is non-segmented, negative-sense RNA, of about 15.384 n. in length, and contains the noncoding 3′ leader and 5′ trailer regions, which are about 50 nucleotides in length. As in other respiroviruses from family Paramyxoviridae, in SeV they work as cis-acting elements essential for replication. A 3′ leader sequence acts as a transcriptional promoter. Between these non-coding regions are located six genes, which encode the nucleocapsid (NP) protein, phosphoprotein (P), matrix protein (M), fusion protein (F), hemagglutinin-neuraminidase (HN) and large (L) protein in this order from the 3′ terminus. The RNA-dependent RNA polymerase of the SeV consists of the large protein (L) and the phosphoprotein (P). The structural gene sequence of SeV is as follows: 3′-NP-P-M-F-HN-L-5′. Intergenomic regions between these genes are three nucleotides long as in other respiroviruses. Additional proteins, which are frequently called non structural or accessory proteins can be produced from the P gene, using alternative reading frames. The Sendai virus P/C mRNA contains five ribosomal initiation sites between positions 81 and 201 from the 5' end. One of these sites initiates in the P open reading frame, whereas four others initiate a nested set of C proteins (C', C, Y1, Y2). These C proteins are initiated in the + 1 reading frame to that of P at different translation starting sites. Sendai virus uses ribosome shunting to express Y1 and Y2 proteins that initiate at the fourth and fifth start sites on the P/C mRNA (respectively). Three additional SeV proteins are also encoded by P/C mRNA. Two of these proteins V and W are products of RNA editing, at codon 317 of the mRNA -G residues are added co-transcriptionally, (+one G residue for V and +two G for W). The third -X protein is represented by 95 amino acids of the C terminal of the P protein and independently initiated by ribosomes. All these non-structural proteins have several functions, including the organization of viral RNA synthesis and helping the virus to infect rodent cells by escaping host innate immunity (see "Virus-induced immunosuppression" section above). It has also been found that C protein facilitates budding of virus-like particles and small amounts of C protein are associated with a viral capsid.

==== Evolution stability ====
The genomes of non-segmented negative-stranded RNA viruses (including paramyxoviruses) have a low rate of homologous recombination and evolve comparatively slowly. Multiple reasons for this genomic stability likely exist: (1) the genomes of these viruses are nonsegmented, therefore cannot undergo genetic reassortment, (2) each protein and each amino acid has an important function. Therefore, any new genetic insertion, substitution or deletion would lead to a decrease or total loss of function that would in turn cause the new virus variant to be less viable. (3) Sendai virus belong to viruses that are governed by the "rule of six". SeV genome as genomes of other paramyxoviruses mainly include six genes, which encode for six major proteins. Low rate of homologous RNA recombination in paramyxoviruses probably results from this unusual genomic requirement for polyhexameric length (6n+0). Natural high genomic stability of SeV is a positive feature for it potential use as a vaccine vector or as an oncolytic agent. For any clinical or industrial applications, it is important that SeV genomic and inserted foreign trans genes would be expressed in a stable way. Paramyxoviruses show relatively little genomic or antigenic change over time. They are known to stably express a wide variety of heterologous antigens at relatively high levels in many species of animals.

=== Viral proteins ===
Name and UniProt link	Alias	Function	Category
Nucleocapsid protein	NP	NP protein forms core structure with viral genomic RNA.	structural proteins
Phosphoroprotein	P	P-protein is a subunit of the viral of RNA-dependent RNA polymerase.	structural proteins
Matrix protein	M	Matrix protein forms the inner layer of the virus envelope and stabilizes it structure.	structural proteins
Fusion protein	F	Envelope glycoprotein F promotes the fusion of the viral lipid envelope with the cell outer membrane and promotes cell-cell fusion.	structural proteins
Hemagglutinin Neuraminidase	HN	Envelope glycoprotein HN is involved in receptor recognition, sialidase activity, promotes the fusion of the viral lipid envelope with the cell outer membrane, promotes cell-cell fusion.	structural proteins
Large protein	L	L protein represents catalytic subunit of RNA-dependent RNA polymerase.The RNA-dependent RNA polymerase of the virus consists of the large protein (L) and the phosphoprotein (P).	structural proteins
C-protein	C	This protein interacts with IKKα serine / threonine kinase and prevents the phosphorylation of IRF7. C-protein binds the interferon-alpha/beta receptor subunit 2 (IFNAR2). This binding inhibits IFN-α-stimulated tyrosine phosphorylation of the upstream receptor-associated kinases, TYK2 and JAK1. C-protein suppresses the signal transduction pathways of interferon alpha/beta (IFN-α/β) and IFN-γ by binding to the N-terminal domain of STAT1. C-protein inhibits the production of nitric oxide (NO) by murine macrophages that has cytotoxic activity against viruses. C-protein inhibits a pathway that includes a Toll-like receptor (TLR7) and TLR9-induction of IFN-alpha, which is specific for plasmacytoid dendritic cells. C-protein is involved into SeV budding and virions cell exit. C-protein facilitates budding by interacting with AIP1/Alix, which is a host protein that is involved in apoptosis and endosomal membrane trafficking.	non structural
C'-protein	C'	apoptosis inhibition, host immunity escape and modulation of virions shape	non structural
Y1-protein	Y1	apoptosis inhibition, host immunity escape and modulation of virions shape	non structural
Y2-protein	Y2	apoptosis inhibition, host immunity escape and modulation of virions shape	non structural
V-protein	V	It binds MDA5 and inhibit its activation of the IFN promoter. It binds RIG-I and TRIM25. This binding prevents downstream RIG-I signaling to the mitochondrial antiviral signaling protein (MAVS) by disrupting TRIM25 -mediated ubiquitination of RIG-I. V-protein suppresses the production of interleukin-1β, by inhibiting the assembly of the inflammasome NLRP3.	non structural
W-protein	W	apoptosis inhibition, host immunity escape and modulation of virions shape	non structural
X-protein	X	apoptosis inhibition, host immunity escape and modulation of virions shape	non structural

=== Proteolytic cleavage by cellular proteases ===
The SeV F protein is a type I membrane glycoprotein that is synthesized as an inactive precursor (F_{0}) that must be activated by proteolytic cleavage at residue arginine-116. After the cleavage F_{0} precursor yields two disulfide-linked subunits F_{1} and F_{2}. Paramyxoviruses use different host cell proteases to activate their F-proteins. Sendai virus uses activating proteases that are serine endopeptidases represented by tryptase beta 2-(TPSB2), WikiGenes – Collaborative Publishing (which has aliases such as tryptase II, tryptase Clara, club cells tryptase, mast cells tryptase,) trypsin 1 (PRSS1), mini-plasmin (PLG) and transmembrane serine protease 2 (TMPRSS2). Most likely, blood clotting factor X (F10) is capable to cleave and activate SeV F_{0}. It is possible that other, not yet identified cellular proteases, can also process the F_{0} protein of SeV.

=== SeV cell entry receptors ===
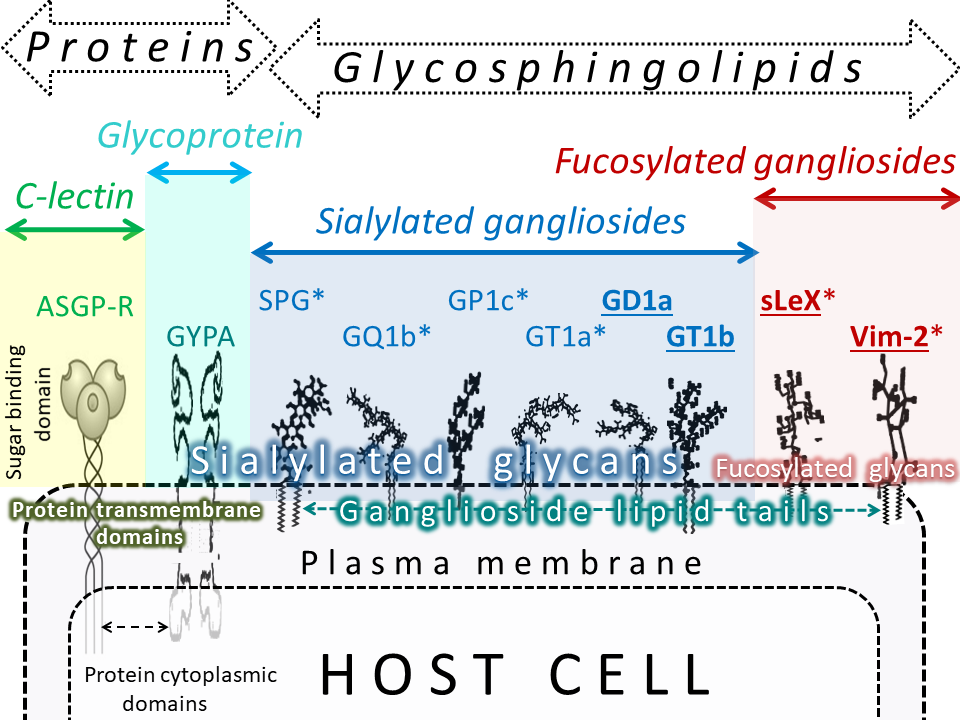
SeV cell entry receptors. The names of receptors with known high binding affinity to the virus are marked with stars. The names of receptors that are overexpressed in some malignancies are in bold and underlined.

To infect host cells SeV must first bind to cell surface receptors using its hemagglutinin-neuraminidase (HN) protein. The receptor-virus attaching process triggers a conformational change in HN, which allosterically promotes the viral fusion (F) protein to promote virus envelope – cell membrane fusion. The receptor attachment is cooperative with respect to receptor density. SeV cell entry receptors are represented mainly by glycoproteins and glycolipids. The table below lists all the molecules that have been shown to function as SeV receptors. Human sialoglycoprotein – cluster of differentiation (CD 235a) is an example of glycoproteins that facilitates SeV cell entry. However, other type of proteins that are not glycoproteins also can assist SeV to penetrate cells. Thus, C-type lectin represented by asialoglycoprotein receptor (ASGP-R), ASGR1) has been shown to be able to function as a SeV cell entry receptor. Among glycosphingolipids two types of glycans are serving as SeV receptors. The first type is represented by fucosylated glycans and the second one by sialylated glycans. The number, positioning, and chemical linkage of sialic acid-containing receptors can be an important determinant of the strength and efficiency of viral attachment, which can play an important role both in host and tissue tropism.

The expression of molecules that can facilitate SeV cell entry, frequently accelerates carcinogenesis and metastasis development. The asialoglycoprotein receptor is highly expressed in liver cancers. The presence of Sialyl-Lewis^{x} antigen (cluster of differentiation 15s (CD15s)), which is a fucosylated glycan, on the outer cell membrane, correlates with invasion potential of malignant cells, tumor recurrence, and overall patient survival for an extremely wide range of cancers. Expression of the Vim2 antigen, which is another SeV cell entry receptor represented by fucosylated glycan, is very important for the extravascular infiltration process of acute myeloid leukemia cells. Metastatic cancer cells often are coated with glycolipids that are rich in sialic acids. SeV binds to α2,3-linked sialic acid containing glycolipids. For example, GD1a, which is a ganglioside and sialylated glycan (glycolipid), is found in large quantities on the surfaces of breast cancer stem cells. High cell surface expression of another SeV receptor – ganglioside sialosylparagloboside /SPG/ NeuAcα2-3PG. characterizes lymphoid leukemia cells. Among other receptors represented by gangliosides GT1b is highly expressed on the outer membranes of cells of brain metastases that originate from an extremely broad range of cancer, while GD1a, GT1b and GQ1b can be detected in human gliosarcomas. However, their quantity does not exceeded the quantity in normal frontal cerebral cortex.

Subtype of receptor molecule	Receptor	**Affinity to SeV**
PROTEINS
LECTIN
C-type lectin	Asialoglycoprotein receptor (ASGP-R)	Not reported
GLYCOPROTEINS
Bovine glycoprotein 2	Glycoprotein 2/ GP2	Not reported
Human sialoglycoprotein - cluster of differentiation	Glycophorin A/ GYPA/ CD235a	High
GANGLIOSIDS (GLYCOSPHINGOLIPIDS)
FUCOSYLATED GLYCANS
Tetrasaccharide – cluster of differentiation	Sialyl-Lewis x antigen/ sLeX/CD15s	High
Ceramide-dodecasaccharide – cluster of differentiation	Vim2 antigen/CD65s/α2,3-sialylatedceramidedodecasaccharide 4c	High
SIALYLATED GLYCANS
Ganglio-series	a-series GM3	Low
Ganglio-series	a-series GD1a, b-series GT1b]	Moderate
Ganglio-series	a-series GT1a, b-series, c-series GP1c	High
Ganglio-series	b-series GQ1b	Very high
Neolacto-series	NeuGca2-3I, Sialoparagloboside/NeuAca2-6PG, NeuAca2-6I	Moderate
Neolacto-series	NeuAcα2-3I,NeuAcα2-6I, NeuAcα2-3i, Sialosylparagloboside /SPG/ NeuAcα2-3PG	Very high

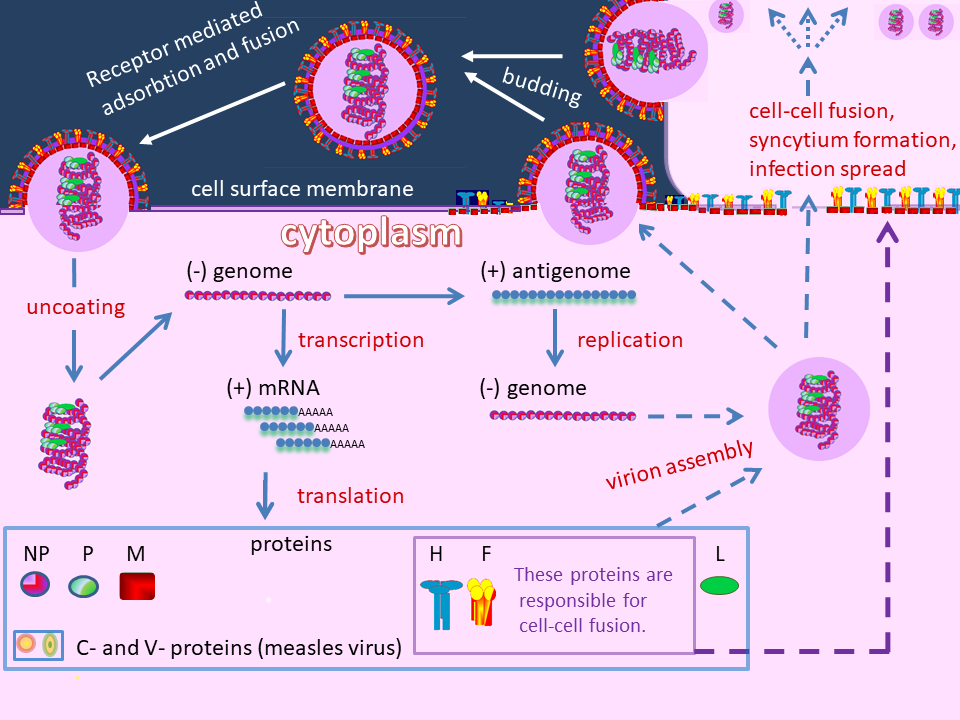
Sendai virus life cycle

A fluorescence microscopy-based assay reveals that the relative number of SeV virions bound to the receptor can be defined as 0.5 for GM3, as 1 for GD1a, and as 2 for Gq1b. The structures of some of these receptors are available for visualization through SugarBindDB – a resource of glycan-mediated host–pathogen interactions. Others are available through KEGG Glycan Database, PubChem compound database, and TOXNET database (toxicology data network) of US National Library of Medicine.

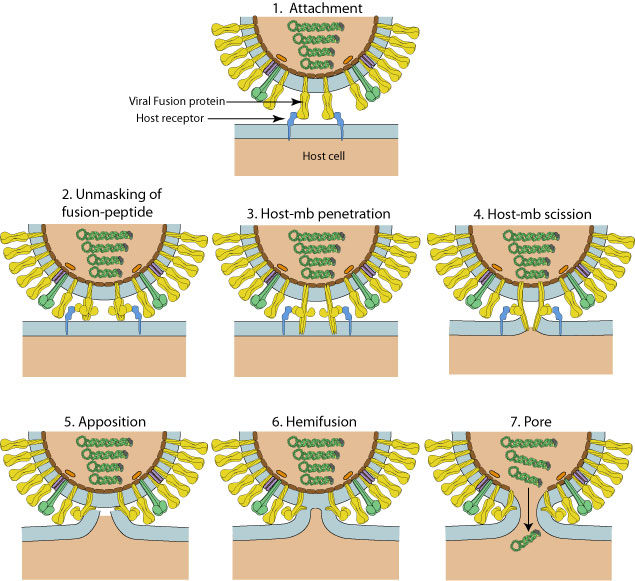
Hypothetical fusion mechanism of viral and cell plasma membrane

=== Life cycle ===
Because SeV is a negative-strand RNA virus the virus entire life cycle is completed in the cytoplasm using its own RNA polymerase.

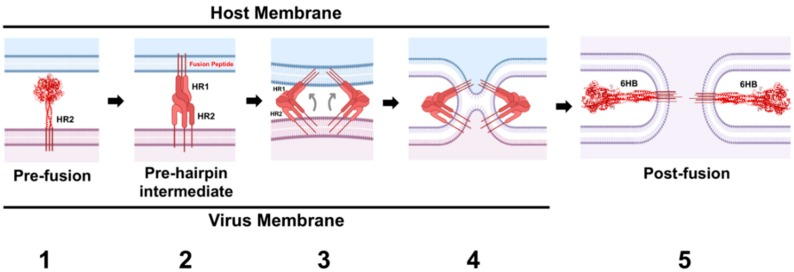
The process of fusion of the virus envelope with the cell membrane.

==== Adsorption and fusion ====
Sendai virus initiates infection process by host cell adsorption mediated by the recognition of specific receptor molecules. Hemagglutinin neuraminidase (HN) serves as a virus cell attachment protein that interacts with a specific cell entry receptor. NH has sialidase activity, and it is capable of cleaving sialic acid residues from the cell receptor. This cleavage triggers the fusion process of viral envelope and cell membrane, which promotes by cooperation of NH with the viral fusion protein (F). The SeV F-protein as other Paramyxovirus structural fusion proteins is a trimeric molecule that belongs to class I viral membrane fusion proteins. To perform the fusion function F protein must be proteolytically activated from it precursor inactive form F_{0}. This activation requires F_{0} cleavage by host serine protease before the virus adsorption (see the section "proteolytic cleavage by cellular proteases"). F_{0} must be cleaved by the host protease into F1 and F2 subunits that remained connected through a disulfide covalent bond. The cleavage site in the F_{0}-protein is located N-terminal to the fusion peptide which has N-terminal hepta-repeat 1 (HR1) and C-terminal Hepta-Repeat 2 (HR2) domains. The illustration below shows 5 stages of the fusion of the virus envelope and cellular host membrane. 1) The pre-fusion, F protein (highlighted in red) is protruding from the lipid bilayer of the viral envelope and is in a close proximity to the cellular membrane. 2) Receptor-HN binding, during the SeV host cell attachment process, triggers the release of the fusion peptide from the F-protein. The peptide inserts itself into the host cell membrane. This insertion is accompanied by the transformation of the HR1 domain from a helical structure to an extended helical trimeric coil-coil structure. 3) Transformed HR1 domain attaches viral F-protein to the host-cell membrane. 4) Two lipid bilayers (viral and cellular) fuse with each other. 5) The fusion of the HR2 and HR1 domains of the F-protein promotes the establishment of a stable six-helix bundle structure (6HB). The formation of the 6HB structure leads to the establishment of the pore and the completion of the fusion process. Viral genomic material enters the host cell through this formed pore.

==== Uncoating ====
After a merging of the host membrane and the viral envelope, the SeV according to one model is "uncoating" with diffusion of the viral envelope proteins into the host plasma membrane. According to another model the virus did not release its envelope proteins into the host membrane. The viral and host membranes are fused and a connecting structure is made. This connecting structure serves as a transportation "highway" for the viral ribonucleoprotein (RNP). Thus, RNP travels through the connecting structure to reach the cell interior allowing SeV genetic material to enter the host cell cytoplasm.

==== Cytoplasmic transcription and replication ====
Once in the cytoplasm, the SeV genomic RNA is getting involved, as a template, in two different RNA synthetic processes performed by RNA-dependent RNA polymerase, which consists of L and P proteins: (1) transcription to generate mRNAs and (2) replication to produce a positive-sense antigenome RNA that in turn acts as a template for production of progeny negative-strand genomes. RNA-dependent RNA polymerase promotes the generation of mRNAs methylated cap structures.

The NP protein is thought to have both structural and functional roles This protein concentration is believed to regulate the switch from RNA transcription to RNA replication. The genomic RNA functions as the template for the viral RNA transcription until the NP protein concentration increases. As the NP protein accumulates, the transition from the transcription to the replication occurs. The NP protein encapsidates the genomic RNA, forming a helical nucleocapsid which is the template for RNA synthesis by the viral RNA polymerase. The protein is a crucial component of the following complexes NP-P (P, phosphoprotein), NP-NP, nucleocapsid-polymerase, and RNA-NP. All these complexes are needed for the viral RNA replication. Research has demonstrated that de novo synthesis of the NP and P proteins is essential for efficient viral transcription. Studies using SeV mutants deficient in NP or P proteins, with genome replication disabled, revealed that the P protein is necessary for viral gene expression. Furthermore, the NP protein plays a crucial role in enhancing primary transcription. Without newly synthesized NP protein, early transcription occurs at minimal levels, while its presence restores normal transcriptional activity. These findings indicate that the synthesis of these proteins facilitates the transition from preliminary to efficient transcription, underscoring their importance in the viral life cycle.

==== Translation ====
Two different sets of proteins are translated from viral mRNAs. The first set is represented by six structural proteins that include nucleocapsid protein (NP), phosphoprotein (P), matrix protein (M), fusion protein (F), neuraminidase (NA) and large protein (L). All these proteins have variable functions and are incorporated into the viral capsid (see the section "Virion structure" above). The second set is represented by seven non structural or accessory proteins. These proteins are translated from the polycistronic mRNA of P gene. This mRNA encodes eight translation products, and P-protein is only one of them. Alternative variants of translation are represented by V, W, C, C′, Y, Y′ and X proteins. The proteins C′, C, Y1, Y2 are products of mRNA alternative reading frame, they collectively referred as C-proteins or C-nested proteins and they share common C-terminal end. The X protein also shares the same C-terminal end and its translation also independently initiated by ribosomes. The proteins V and W are products of cotranscriptional mRNA editing. All these non-structural proteins have multiple functions, including the organization of viral RNA synthesis and helping the virus to infect host cells by escaping host innate immunity (see "Virus-induced immunosuppression" section above).

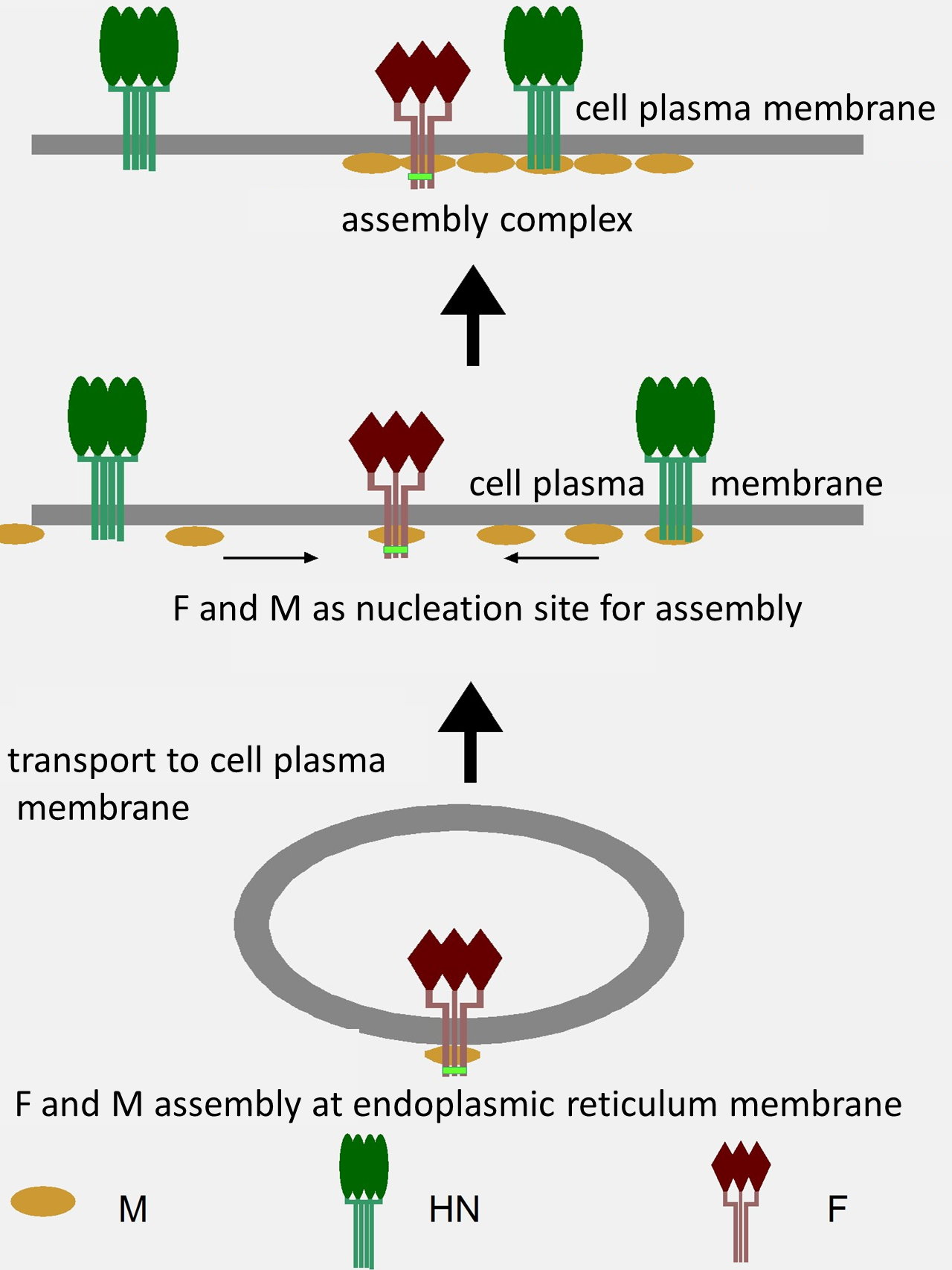
Possible model depicting formation of the viral assembly complex

==== Transportation of RNP and viral proteins to cellular membrane ====
After translation, SeV nucleocapsids (RNP complex) assemble, and move using microtubules network through intracellular vesicular trafficking pathway. In preparation for the budding process, three viral lipophilic proteins HN, F and M migrate through the secretory pathway to a host cell membrane. It is assumed that the interaction of these three proteins with each other is needed for their migration to cellular budding sites. The binding of lipophilic protein complex to the host membrane facilitates the interaction of this three protein complex with the SeV nucleocapsid. It has been shown that for efficient virion production SeV induces the β-cytoplasmic actin remodeling in its host cell.

==== Syncytium formation and direct cell-to-cell infection transmission ====
Two of SeV proteins: HA and F, after their binding directly to a cellular membrane, promote a cell-cell fusion, which leads to a large multinuclear cell formation (syncytium). This formation involves the fusion of infected cells with adjacent target cells and remains an important mechanism of direct cell-to-cell spread of viral components. Thus, a SeV infection in a form of genetic material in partially assembled virions can spread without any exposure to host neutralizing antibodies (see the section "Directed cells fusion (syncytium formation)" for details and references).

==== Budding ====
Sendai virus, as all other envelope viruses, uses host cellular membrane lipid bilayer for viral capsid membrane formation. Binding to a host cell membrane of viral proteins (M, HN and F) promotes their interaction with RNP complex, which is composed of the viral genomic RNA bound to SeV proteins (NP, P and L). Thus, all viral structural components, including viral glycoproteins and genomic RNP complex, are getting assembled together. After such assembling the infectious viral particles are budding out from individually or collectively infected cells (syncytia). It has been suggested that recirculating endosomes are involved in viral RNP complex translocation. C-protein facilitates budding by interacting with AIP1/Alix, which is a host protein that is involved in apoptosis and endosomal membrane trafficking. The infectious virus particles usually released by 24 hours post infection (hpi), and peak titers appeared between 48 and 72 hpi.

==== Persistent infection ====
Sendai virus can establish persistent infection in its host cells. Multiple rounds of virus subculturing result in a creation of new virus variants with high ability to establish persistent infection. These SeV variants develop certain genotypic changes. Specific amino acid substitutions accumulated in the M protein and the L protein were show to be associated with persistent infection in mouse connective tissue cells (L-929) and hamster kidney fibroblasts (BHK-21). It has been shown that 4–5 point mutations might distinguish Sendai variants capable of persistent infections from those that are incapable. The most common single nucleotide mutations are found in the leader sequence (position 16) and in the following genes: the M gene (position 850), the F gene (position 782), and the L gene (positions 832 and 1743).

The persistent infection can also be established instantly in interferon regulatory factor 3 (IRF-3)-knockdown cells. IRF-3 is a key proapoptotic protein that after activation by SeV triggers apoptosis. IRF-3-knockdown cells express viral protein and produces low levels of infectious virions. IRF-3 controls the fate of the SeV-infected cells by triggering apoptosis and preventing persistence establishment; therefore its knock down allows persistence to occur. It was also reported that during SeV infection replication defective viral genomes (DVG) are forming and selectively protect a subpopulation of host cells from death, therefore promoting the establishment of persistent infections. The possibility of establishing a chronic viral infection was further demonstrated in Sendai virus-infected ovine fibroblasts. In nature, enzootic disease patterns suggest that the virus can be latent and can be cleared over the course of a year.

=== Directed cells fusion (syncytium formation) ===
One recognized feature of the Sendai virus, shared with members of its genus, is the ability to induce syncytia formation in vivo and in vitro in eukaryotic cell cultures. The formation of syncytium helps the virus to avoid neutralizing antibodies of the host organism during the spread of infection. The mechanism for this process is fairly well understood and is very similar to the fusion process employed by the virion to facilitate cellular entry. The activities of the receptor binding hemagglutinin-neuraminidase protein is solely responsible for inducing close interaction between the virus envelope and the cellular membrane.

However, it is the F protein (one of many membrane fusion proteins) that, when triggered by local dehydration and a conformational change in the bound HN protein, actively inserts into the cellular membrane, which causes the envelope and the membrane to merge, followed shortly by virion entry. When the HN and F protein are manufactured by the cell and expressed on the surface, the same process may occur between adjacent cells, causing extensive membrane fusion and resulting in the formation of a syncytium.

Using the model of cellular hepatocarcinoma (Hep G2), it has been shown that Sendai virus recruits the cellular protein villin for cell fusion and syncytia formation. The villin-actin interaction regulates the fusion of the viral envelope and the cell membrane. Thus, villin is a host cell cofactor that regulates the fusion process. Its down-regulation with siRNA inhibits SeV infection of Hep G2 cells.

The cell fusion property of SeV was utilized by Köhler and Milstein, who published an article in 1975 outlining a revolutionary method of manufacturing monoclonal antibodies. In need of a reliable method to produce large quantities of a specific antibody, the two merged a monoclonal B cell, exposed to a chosen antigen, and a myeloma tumor cell to produce hybridomas, capable of being grown indefinitely and of producing significant amounts of an antibody specifically targeting the chosen antigen. Though more efficient methods of creating such hybrids have since been found, Köhler and Milstein first used Sendai virus to create their revolutionary cells.

== Sensitive cell lines, primary cultures and virus strains ==
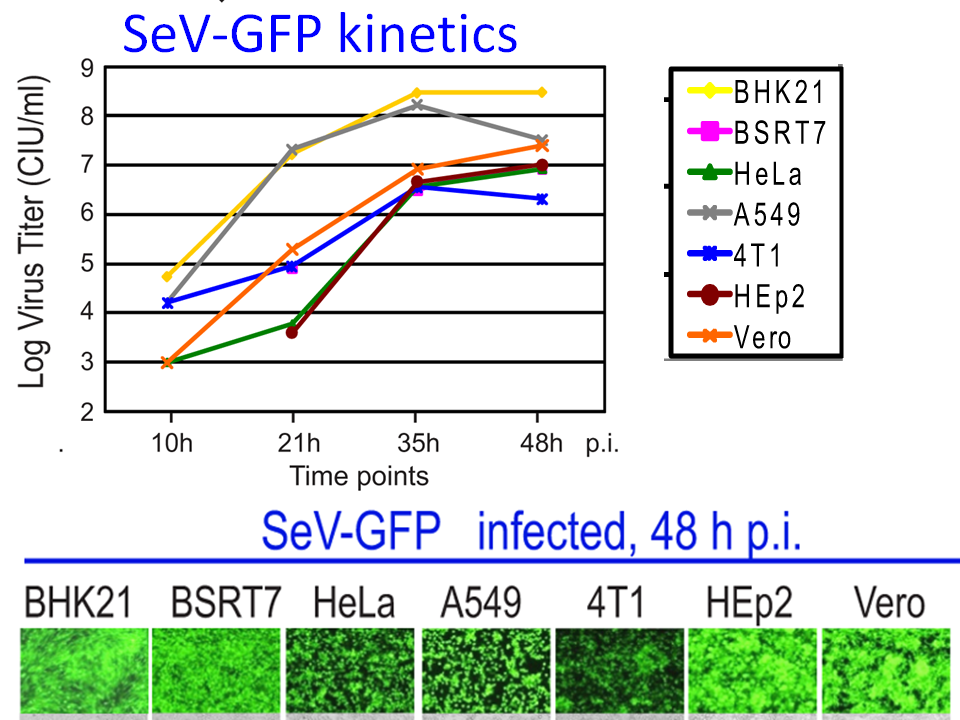
Variable sensitivity of different cell lines to infection

=== Cell lines ===
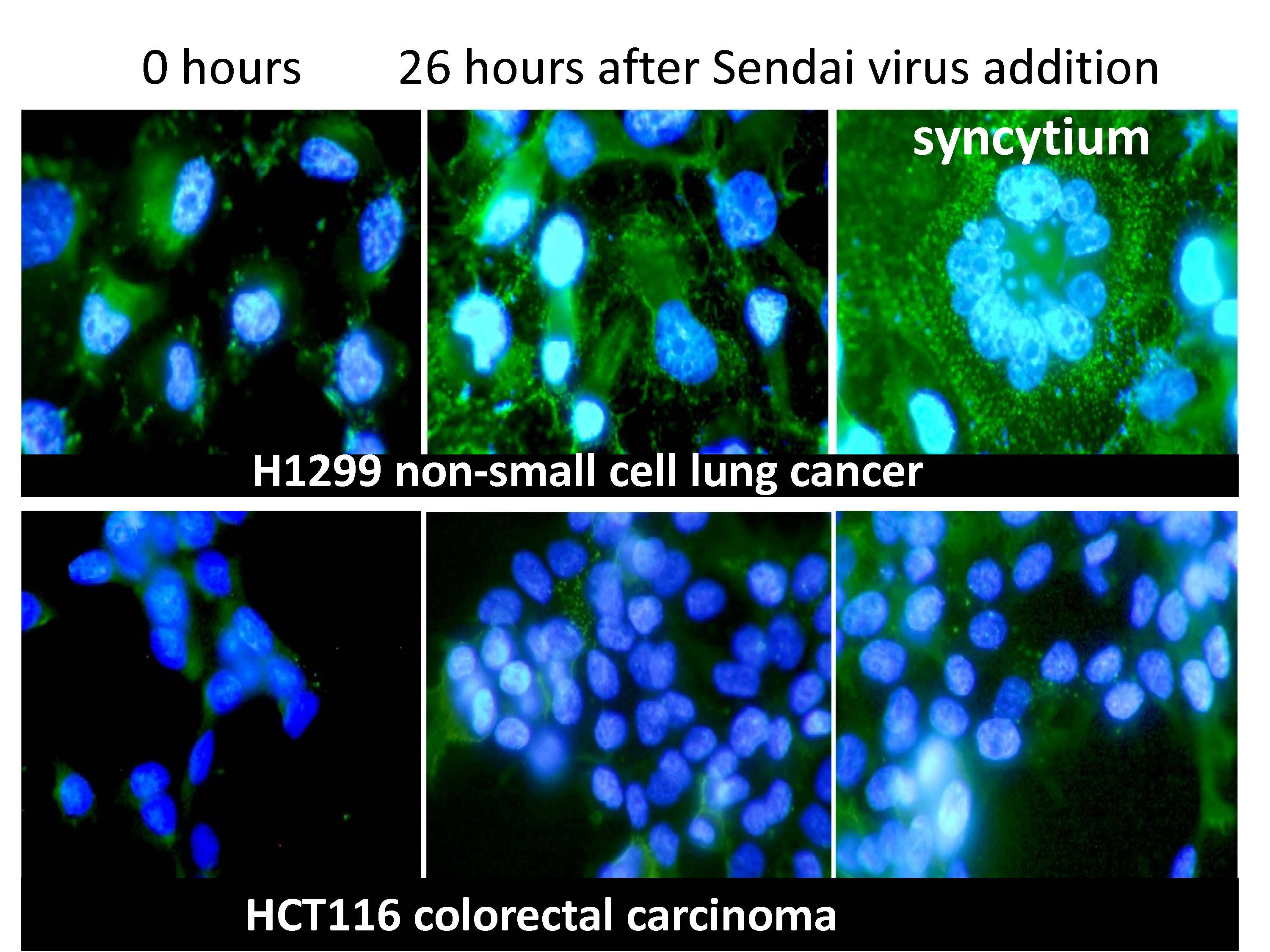
Infection spreads with variable efficiency. The virus was visualized with green fluorescent antibodies, and cell nuclei were stained with DAPI blue fluorescent dye. Photographs were taken immediately after the addition of virus to the cells and 26 hours later.

Scientific studies show that the following cell lines are susceptible to SeV infection to varying degrees.

Cell line	Origin
CaCo2	human colon carcinoma
Hep G2	human liver carcinoma
Huh7	human well differentiated hepatocyte-derived carcinoma
PLC/PRF/5	human hepatoma
MCF7	human breast adenocarcinoma
A549	human lung carcinoma
Calu-3	human lung carcinoma
HeLa,	human cervical carcinoma
U937	human histiocytic lymphoma
U87MG	most likely, human glioma
U118	human glioblastoma
Mel8	human melanoma
THP-1	humane monocytes of monocytic leukemia
Namalwa	human Burkitt lymphoma
PC-3	human prostate carcinoma derived from metastatic site in bone
DU145	human prostate carcinoma derived from metastatic site in brain
4T1	mouse mammary gland metastatic adenocarcinoma
WD-PBEC	human primary bronchial epithelial cells
HEK 293	human embryonic kidney cells
Vero cell	monkey kidney epitelial cells
LLC MK2	resus monkey kidney cells
4647	green monkey kidney cells
CV1	green monkey kidney cells
MDCK	canine kidney cells
MDBK	bovine kidney cells
BHK 21	hamster baby kidney fibroblasts
L929	murine fibroblasts

Some of these cells (for example, LLC MK2, 4647 and HEK 293) do not express a protease that processes fusion protein F0 of Sendai virus; therefore, they produce non-infectious virions.

Type 1 IFN inhibits the SeV production in normal human respiratory cells, but fails of doing it in human cells that originates from variable malignancies such as U937, Namalwa, and A549.

Variable cell cultures obtained from tumors have different sensitivity to SeV, and can also produce the virus in different quantities. There are multiple factors that are responsible for this variability. For example, an inverse correlation was observed between cells sensitivity to SeV infection and constitutive mRNA expression levels of TLR 3 and TLR 7 in primary cultures of prostate cancer. Thus, defective TLR-activated IFN signaling is one of these factors.

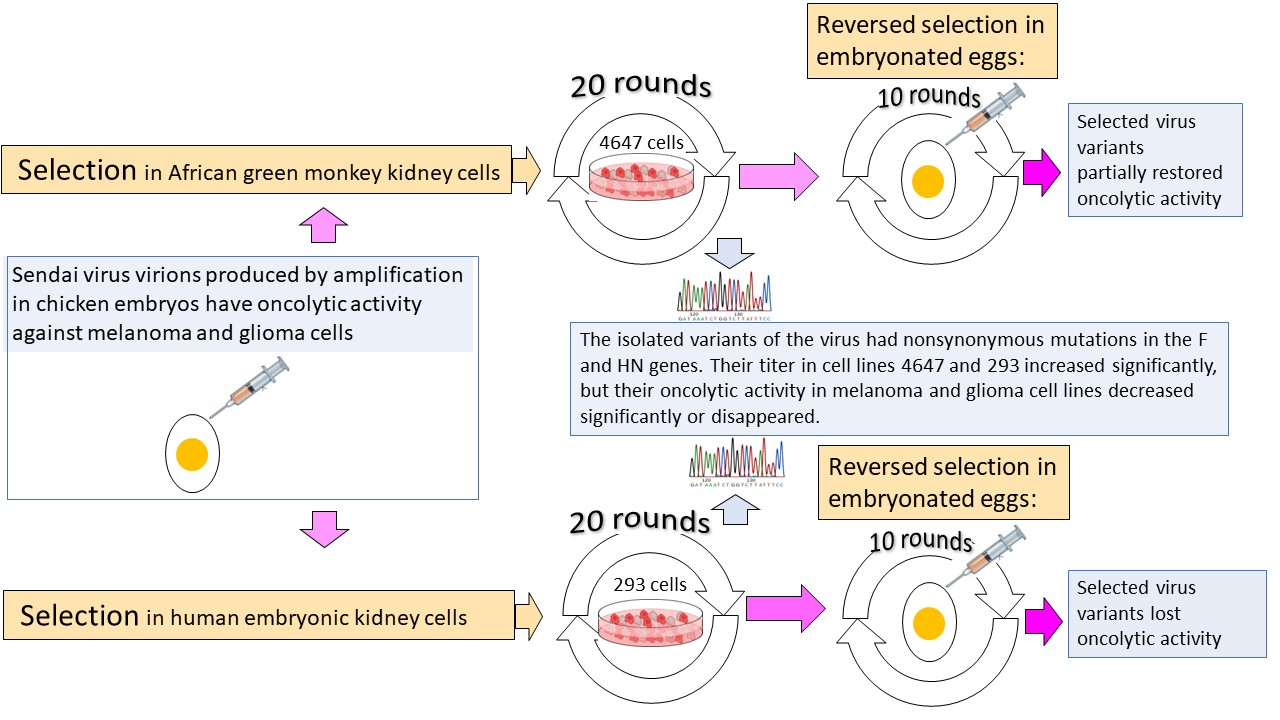
Virus partially or completely loses oncolytic activity after adapting to growth in cell cultures

=== Virus adaptation to grow in cell cultures ===
SeV strain variants adapted for growth in different cells have different properties. One study shows that the SeV variant adapted for growth in LLC-MK2 cells and the SeV variant adapted for growth in embryonated eggs differ by two amino acids in the HN protein. This difference results in different neuraminidase conformations around the receptor binding site and variations in neuraminidase activity between the two viral variants. Another research study shows that SeV variants, adapted to grow in cell culture 4647 (African green monkey kidney cells) and in HEK 293 (human embryonic kidney cells) instead of embryonated chicken eggs, also acquire mutations in HN gene and both SeV variants lost their oncolytic activity.

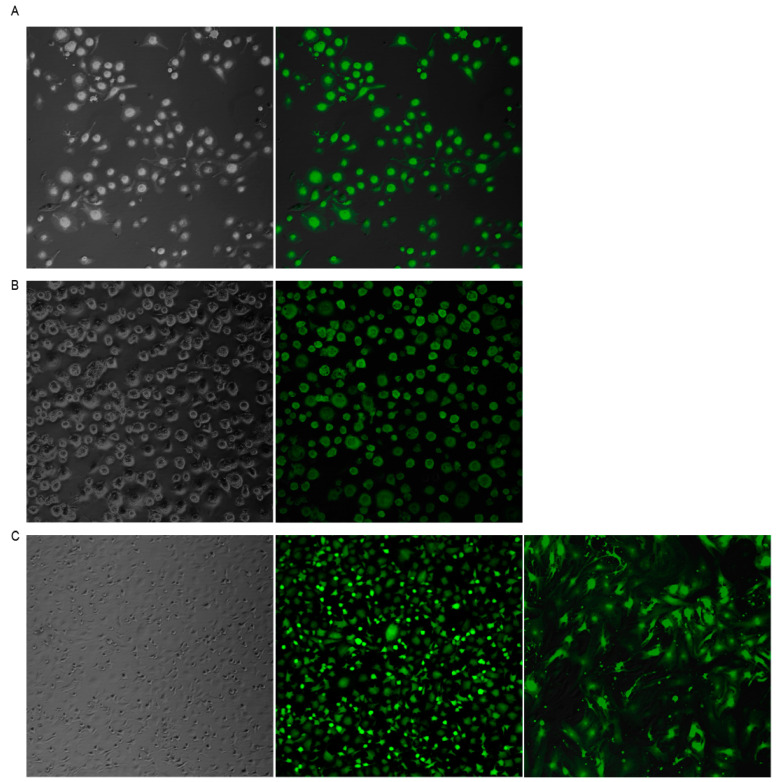
Sendai virus green fluorescent protein infection of ovine cells. Fluorescence microscopy images of alveolar macrophages (A), blood-derived macrophages (B), and ovine skin fibroblasts (C) infected with Sendai virus vector expressing the GFP (right panel) at a multiplicity of infection (MOI) of 10. Bright-field images are shown in the left panel. The three cell types and all cells in the three cultures are GFP-positive. Ovine fibroblasts remained GFP-positive after 13 in vitro culture passages ((C), third image).

=== Primary cultures ===
Ovine blood-derived and alveolar macrophages can be infected with SeV ex vivo. Experiments with a virus construct with an inserted green fluorescent protein (SeV-GFP) showed that infection reaches 100% of cells in 48 hours. Primary cell cultures of ovine skin fibroblasts can also be infected and also achieve 100% GFP positivity. In fibroblasts, an intracellular virus-associated GFP expression was stable at least for more than a dozen passages in cell culture. However, an infectious virus was not produced in these ovine cells. This fact was demonstrated by the transfer of supernatants from SeV-infected cells into fresh cultures. In addition, human skin fibroblasts can be infected with Sendai virus. SeV can replicate to high titers in human monocyte-derived DCs.

=== Persistent infection ===
Most often, SeV infection initiates an apoptotic program in the host cells, which leads to the death of target cells without interrupting the life cycle of the virus. However, paramyxoviruses, including SeV, can cause persistent infection in primary cell cultures that does not kill cells or turn off cellular RNA transcription and translation. It has been demonstrated that mouse connective tissues cells (L-929) and hamster kidney fibroblasts (BHK-21) can become infected with Sendai virus and the infection can be persistent. The possibility of establishing a persistent viral infection was demonstrated in SeV-infected ovine fibroblasts.

=== Strains ===
==== History ====
All Sendai virus strains belong to the same serotype. The origin of many strains of SeV was described in 1978. Some strains such as Ohita and Hamamatsu were described later. Ohita and Hamanatsu strains were isolated from separate epidemics in laboratory mice. According to the personal memory of Alisa G. Bukrinskaya, who has co-authored numerous publications related to SeV along with Viktor M. Zhdanov, starting in 1961, the Moscow strain of SeV was obtained by Viktor M. Zhdanov of the Ivanovsky Institute of Virology from Japan in the late 1950s or early 1960s, It is reported that the BB1 strain derived from the Moscow virus strain. The strain BB1 was given to the researchers of Institute of Viral Disease Control and Prevention, Beijing, China by researchers of Ivanovsky Institute of Virology, Moscow, Russia in the 1960s.

==== Virulence ====
A field SeV isolate, that is attenuated through egg-passages, is less virulent for mouse respiratory cells. Therefore, the strains that were isolated from animals a few decades ago and went through multiple passages in eggs are less virulent for mice in comparison with the strains that are fresh field isolates.

==== Defective interfering genomes or particles ====
Defective interfering (DI) genomes or defective viral genomes (DVGs) or defective interfering particles (DIPs) are replication defective viral RNA products generated during viral infections by many types of viruses, including SeV. It has been experimentally established that DI genomes can be readily produced by viral infection at high multiplicity. A single amino acid substitution in a nucleoprotein (NP) causes an increased production rate of DI genomes in the SeV Cantell strain, which is known for its particularly strong induction of interferon beta (IFN-β) during viral infection. It has been shown that DI are responsible for this strong IFN-β induction. Other genomic change such as loss of the Sendai virus C-protein has also been demonstrated to cause accumulation of DI genomes.

==== Strains origin and sequence ID ====
Strain name	Origin	Sequence ID
Z (Sendai/52, or VR-105, or Fushimi)	derivative of murine isolate of 50s (Japan)	AB855655.1
Cantell (VR-907)	derivative of the same isolate as above	AB855654.1
Enders	derivative of the same isolate as above	*
Nagoya	derivative of the same isolate as above	AB275417.1 AB195968.1
Moscow	derivative of murine isolate of 50-60s (Japan or Russia)	KP717417.1
BB1	derivative of the same murine isolate of 50-60s as above (Japan or Russia)	DQ219803.1
Ohita	murine isolate of 70-90s (Japan)	NC_001552.1
Hamamatsu	independent from Ohita, murine isolate of 70-90s (Japan)	AB039658

*The sequence of Enders strain is available from the US patent Modified Sendai virus vaccine and imaging vector

==== Strains sequence similarity ====
Strain name	Z	Cantell	Enders	Nagoya	Moscow	BB1	Ohita	Hamamatsu
Sendai Virus	Megablast homology for SeV complete genome (%)							
Z	100							
Cantell	99.3	100						
Enders	99.4	99.2	100					
Nagoya	98.9			100				
Moscow	88.1		88.6	87.9	100			
BB1	88.1				99.9	100		
Ohita	88.9				91.2		100	
Hamamatsu	91.7				91.7		99.2	100
Human parainfluenza Virus 1	Discontiguous megablast for complete viral genomes (%) seq. ID AF457102.1							
HPV1 (strain Washington/1964)	75.2	73.9			74.5			74.6
Porcine parainfluenza virus 1	Discontiguous megablast for complete viral genomes (%) seq.ID NC_025402.1							
PPV1 (strain S206N)	71.15	75.1			70.5			71

== Virus preparation and titration ==
Sendai virus can be produced using specific pathogen-free (SPF) embryonated chicken eggs. Sendai virus, adapted to grow in cell culture instead of chicken eggs, loses its oncolytic activity.

The Sendai virus titer can be evaluated by serial end point 10x dilution assay of the virus-containing material in embryonated chicken eggs. This assay evaluates the final dilution that may cause a viral infection in 50% of inoculated eggs. This EID50 assay is used to quantify titer for many viruses that can be grown in eggs. The measurement of virus titer obtained from this assay is expressed as an embryonic infectious dose 50% (EID50). The SeV titer can also be assessed by using plaque assay in LLC-MK2 cells and by serial end point 2x dilution hemagglutination assay (HA). However, the HA test is less reliable than the EID50 or PFU tests because it does not always indicate the presence of a viable virus in a sample. The dead virus might demonstrate high HA titers.

== Recent developments (2024–2025) ==
Research in 2024 and 2025 has expanded the therapeutic potential of Sendai virus (SeV) vectors in reproductive medicine, oncology, and transient gene editing.

- Reproductive Medicine: In 2024, a study demonstrated that SeV-mediated RNA delivery of the Kitl gene successfully re-initiated oogenesis and restored fertility in congenitally and chemotherapy-induced infertile female mice without genomic integration.
- Oncology: A 2024 study found that SeV provides more robust and consistent gene delivery into human pancreatic cancer cells than adeno-associated virus (AAV) or lentiviral vectors, regardless of tumor subtype.
- CRISPR-Cas9 Delivery: A next-generation "interferon-silent" and temperature-sensitive (ts) SeV platform was introduced in 2024, achieving over 90% editing efficiency in primary human hematopoietic stem and progenitor cells (HSPCs). In 2025, this ts SeV platform was further applied to deliver CRISPR/Cas9 for precise engineering of the human cytomegalovirus (HCMV) genome, bypassing traditional bacterial artificial chromosome (BAC) constraints and enabling editing in diverse cell types.
