= ST3GAL4 =

Protein-coding gene in the species Homo sapiens

Identifiers
- Aliases: ST3GAL4, CGS23, NANTA3, SAT3, SIAT4, SIAT4C, ST3GalIV, STZ, ST3 beta-galactoside alpha-2,3-sialyltransferase 4, ST-4, gal-NAc6S, ST3GalA.2
- External IDs: OMIM: 104240; MGI: 1316743; GeneCards: ST3GAL4
Enzyme activity
EC #	BRENDA	ExPASy	KEGG	MetaCyc
2.4.3.2	↗	↗	↗	↗
2.4.3.4	↗	↗	↗	↗
2.4.3.6	↗	↗	↗	↗

Gene location (Human)
Chr.	Chromosome 11 (human)
Band	11q24.2	Start	126,355,640 bp
Band	11q24.2	End	126,440,344 bp

Gene location (Mouse)
Chr.	Chromosome 9 (mouse)
Band	9|9 A4	Start	34,957,872 bp
Band	9|9 A4	End	35,030,564 bp
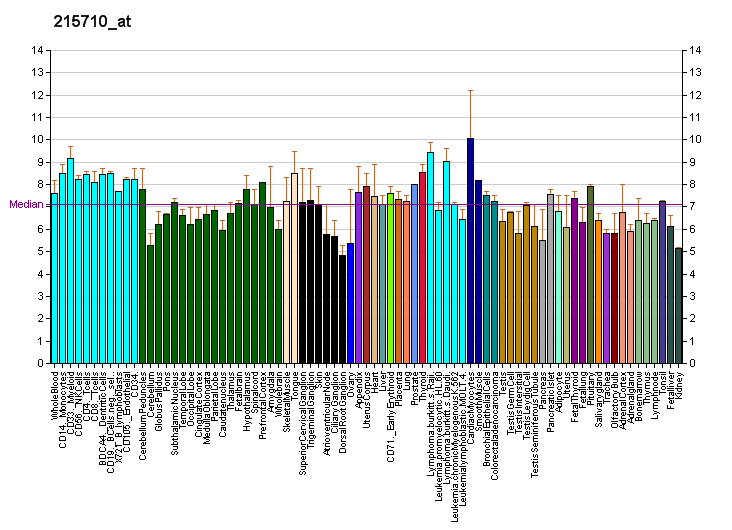

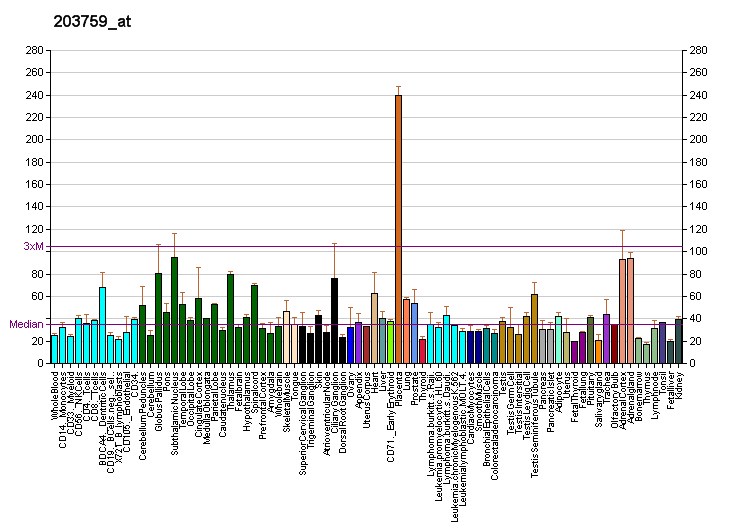
RNA expression pattern
Bgee	Human / Mouse (ortholog); Top expressed in: left adrenal cortex; right adrenal cortex; left ovary; right ovary; rectum; C1 segment; right auricle of heart; tibial nerve; transverse colon; right testis / Top expressed in: Ileal epithelium; jejunum; gallbladder; crypt of lieberkuhn of small intestine; molar; granulocyte; parotid gland; submandibular gland; duodenum; liver; More reference expression data
BioGPS	More reference expression data
Gene ontology
Molecular function	transferase activity; glycosyltransferase activity; sialyltransferase activity; beta-galactoside (CMP) alpha-2,3-sialyltransferase activity; monosialoganglioside sialyltransferase activity
Cellular component	integral component of membrane; Golgi apparatus; Golgi cisterna membrane; extracellular region; extracellular exosome; membrane; Golgi membrane
Biological process	cognition; O-glycan processing; keratan sulfate biosynthetic process; oligosaccharide metabolic process; protein N-linked glycosylation via asparagine; protein glycosylation; glycoprotein biosynthetic process; glycolipid biosynthetic process; oligosaccharide biosynthetic process; lipid glycosylation; sialylation; protein sialylation
Sources:Amigo / QuickGO
Orthologs
Databases	NCBI: entry; OMA: entry
Species	Human	Mouse
Entrez	6484	20443
Ensembl	ENSG00000110080	ENSMUSG00000032038
UniProt	Q11206	Q91Y74
RefSeq (mRNA)	NM_001254757; NM_001254758; NM_001254759; NM_006278; NM_001348396 NM_001348398; NM_001348399; NM_001348400; NM_001348397	NM_009178
RefSeq (protein)	NP_001241686; NP_001241687; NP_001241688; NP_006269; NP_001335325 NP_001335327; NP_001335328; NP_001335329; NP_001335326	NP_033204
Location (UCSC)	Chr 11: 126.36 – 126.44 Mb	Chr 9: 34.96 – 35.03 Mb
PubMed search
- Wikidata
View/Edit Human	View/Edit Mouse

CMP-N-acetylneuraminate-beta-galactosamide-alpha-2,3-sialyltransferase is an enzyme that in humans is encoded by the ST3GAL4 gene.
