= ST6 beta-galactoside alpha-2,6-sialyltransferase 2 =

Protein-coding gene in the species Homo sapiens

ST6GAL2

Identifiers
- Aliases: ST6GAL2, SIAT2, ST6GalII, ST6 beta-galactoside alpha-2,6-sialyltransferase 2
- External IDs: OMIM: 608472; MGI: 2445190; GeneCards: ST6GAL2
Enzyme activity
EC #	BRENDA	ExPASy	KEGG	MetaCyc
2.4.3.1	↗	↗	↗	↗

Gene location (Human)
Chr.	Chromosome 2 (human)
Band	2q12.3	Start	106,801,600 bp
Band	2q12.3	End	106,887,108 bp
RNA expression pattern
Bgee	Human / Mouse (ortholog); Top expressed in: right coronary artery; ganglionic eminence; Descending thoracic aorta; ascending aorta; left coronary artery; germinal epithelium; thyroid gland; gonad; right lobe of thyroid gland; left lobe of thyroid gland / n/a; More reference expression data
BioGPS	n/a
Gene ontology
Molecular function	transferase activity; catalytic activity; sialyltransferase activity; glycosyltransferase activity; beta-galactoside alpha-2,6-sialyltransferase activity
Cellular component	integral component of membrane; Golgi cisterna membrane; Golgi apparatus; membrane; Golgi membrane
Biological process	multicellular organism development; protein glycosylation; oligosaccharide metabolic process; sialylation; protein N-linked glycosylation via asparagine; growth; carbohydrate metabolic process
Sources:Amigo / QuickGO
Orthologs
Databases	NCBI: entry; OMA: entry
Species	Human	Mouse
Entrez	84620	240119
Ensembl	ENSG00000144057	ENSMUSG00000024172
UniProt	Q96JF0	Q76K27
RefSeq (mRNA)	NM_001142351; NM_001142352; NM_032528; NM_001322362	NM_172829
RefSeq (protein)	NP_001135823; NP_001135824; NP_001309291; NP_115917	NP_001334332
Location (UCSC)	Chr 2: 106.8 – 106.89 Mb	n/a
PubMed search
- Wikidata
View/Edit Human	View/Edit Mouse

ST6 beta-galactoside alpha-2,6-sialyltransferase 2 is a protein that in humans is encoded by the ST6GAL2 gene.

== Function ==
This locus encodes a sialyltransferase. The encoded type II transmembrane protein catalyzes the transfer of sialic acid from CMP to an oligosaccharide substrate. Polymorphisms at this locus may be associated with variations in risperidone response in schizophrenic patients. Alternatively spliced transcript variants have been described. [provided by RefSeq, Jan 2012].
