= Fucosidase =

Fucosidase is an enzyme, fucohydrolase, a type of glycoside hydrolase.

Fucosidase may refer to:

- α-L-fucosidase (EC 3.2.1.51)
  - Tissue alpha-L-fucosidase, encoded by FUCA1 gene
  - Plasma alpha-L-fucosidase, encoded by FUCA2 gene
- 1,2-α-L-fucosidase (EC 3.2.1.63)
- 1,3-α-L-fucosidase (EC 3.2.1.111)
- 1,6-α-L-fucosidase (EC 3.2.1.127)
- β-D-Fucosidase (EC 3.2.1.38)

== See also ==
- EC number
- Fucose
