= List of conditions treated with hematopoietic stem cell transplantation =

Hematopoietic stem cell transplantation may be used to treat a number of conditions both congenital and acquired.

== Acquired ==
- Malignancies
  - Hematological
    - Leukemias
      - Acute lymphoblastic leukemia (ALL)
      - Acute myeloid leukemia (AML)
      - Chronic lymphocytic leukemia (CLL)
      - Chronic myelogenous leukemia (CML), accelerated phase or blast crisis
    - Lymphomas
      - Hodgkin's disease
      - Non-Hodgkin's lymphoma
    - Myelomas
      - Multiple myeloma (Kahler's disease)
  - Solid tumor cancers
    - Neuroblastoma
    - Desmoplastic small round cell tumor
    - Ewing's sarcoma
    - Choriocarcinoma
- Hematologic disease
  - Phagocyte disorders
    - Myelodysplasia
  - Anemias
    - Paroxysmal nocturnal hemoglobinuria (PNH; severe aplasia)
    - Aplastic anemia
    - Acquired pure red cell aplasia
  - Myeloproliferative disorders
    - Polycythemia vera
    - Essential thrombocytosis
    - Myelofibrosis
- Metabolic disorders
  - Amyloidoses
    - Amyloid light chain (AL) amyloidosis
- Environmentally-induced diseases
  - Radiation poisoning
- Viral diseases
  - HTLV
  - HIV
- Autoimmune diseases
  - Multiple sclerosis

== Congenital ==
- Lysosomal storage disorders
  - Lipidoses (disorders of lipid storage)
    - Neuronal ceroid lipofuscinoses
      - Infantile neuronal ceroid lipofuscinosis (INCL, Santavuori disease,)
      - Jansky–Bielschowsky disease (late infantile neuronal ceroid lipofuscinosis)
    - Sphingolipidoses
      - Niemann–Pick disease
      - Gaucher disease
    - Leukodystrophies
      - Adrenoleukodystrophy
      - Metachromatic leukodystrophy
      - Krabbe disease (globoid cell leukodystrophy)
  - Mucopolysaccharidoses
      - Hurler syndrome (MPS I H, α-L-iduronidase deficiency)
      - Scheie syndrome (MPS I S)
      - Hurler–Scheie syndrome (MPS I H-S)
      - Hunter syndrome (MPS II, iduronidase sulfate deficiency)
      - Sanfilippo syndrome (MPS III)
      - Morquio syndrome (MPS IV)
      - Maroteaux–Lamy syndrome (MPS VI)
      - Sly syndrome (MPS VII)
  - Glycoproteinoses
      - Mucolipidosis II (I-cell disease)
      - Fucosidosis
      - Aspartylglucosaminuria
      - Alpha-mannosidosis
  - Other
      - Wolman disease (acid lipase deficiency)
- Immunodeficiencies
  - T-cell deficiencies
    - Ataxia-telangiectasia
    - DiGeorge syndrome
  - Combined T- and B-cell deficiencies
    - Severe combined immunodeficiency (SCID), all types
  - Well-defined syndromes
    - Wiskott–Aldrich syndrome
  - Phagocyte disorders
    - Kostmann syndrome
    - Shwachman–Diamond syndrome
  - Immune dysregulation diseases
    - Griscelli syndrome, type II
  - Innate immune deficiencies
    - NF-Kappa-B Essential Modulator (NEMO) deficiency (Inhibitor of Kappa Light Polypeptide Gene Enhancer in B Cells Gamma Kinase deficiency)
- Hematologic diseases
    - Hemoglobinopathies
    - Sickle cell disease
    - β thalassemia major (Cooley's anemia)
  - Anemias
    - Aplastic anemia
      - Diamond–Blackfan anemia
      - Fanconi anemia
  - Cytopenias
    - Amegakaryocytic thrombocytopenia
  - Hemophagocytic syndromes
    - Hemophagocytic lymphohistiocytosis (HLH)
