= Tissue alpha-L-fucosidase =

Protein found in humans

FUCA1

Identifiers
- Aliases: FUCA1, FUCA, fucosidase, alpha-L- 1, tissue, alpha-L-fucosidase 1
- External IDs: OMIM: 612280; MGI: 95593; GeneCards: FUCA1
Enzyme activity
EC #	BRENDA	ExPASy	KEGG	MetaCyc
3.2.1.51	↗	↗	↗	↗

Gene location (Human)
Chr.	Chromosome 1 (human)
Band	1p36.11	Start	23,845,077 bp
Band	1p36.11	End	23,868,290 bp

Gene location (Mouse)
Chr.	Chromosome 4 (mouse)
Band	4 D3|4 68.01 cM	Start	135,648,046 bp
Band	4 D3|4 68.01 cM	End	135,667,622 bp
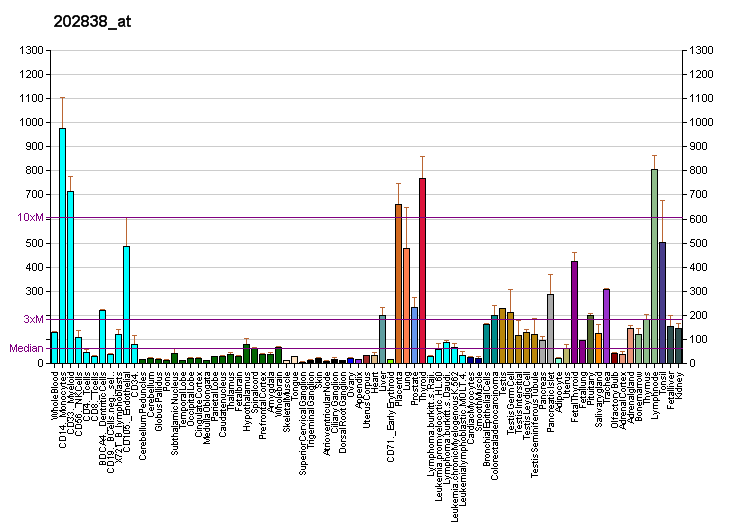
RNA expression pattern
Bgee	Human / Mouse (ortholog); Top expressed in: mucosa of sigmoid colon; mucosa of ileum; jejunal mucosa; rectum; corpus epididymis; duodenum; nasal epithelium; palpebral conjunctiva; renal medulla; pancreatic ductal cell / Top expressed in: right kidney; duodenum; colon; left colon; human kidney; granulocyte; stroma of bone marrow; jejunum; ileum; epithelium of stomach; More reference expression data
BioGPS	More reference expression data
Gene ontology
Molecular function	hydrolase activity; alpha-L-fucosidase activity; hydrolase activity, acting on glycosyl bonds
Cellular component	cytoplasm; lysosome; lysosomal lumen; extracellular exosome; extracellular region; azurophil granule lumen
Biological process	fucose metabolic process; metabolism; glycosaminoglycan catabolic process; glycoside catabolic process; neutrophil degranulation; glycolipid catabolic process; carbohydrate metabolic process
Sources:Amigo / QuickGO
Orthologs
Databases	NCBI: entry; OMA: entry
Species	Human	Mouse
Entrez	2517	71665
Ensembl	ENSG00000179163	ENSMUSG00000028673
UniProt	P04066	Q99LJ1
RefSeq (mRNA)	NM_000147	NM_024243
RefSeq (protein)	NP_000138	NP_077205
Location (UCSC)	Chr 1: 23.85 – 23.87 Mb	Chr 4: 135.65 – 135.67 Mb
PubMed search
- Wikidata
View/Edit Human	View/Edit Mouse

Tissue alpha-L-fucosidase is an enzyme that in humans is encoded by the FUCA1 gene.

Alpha-fucosidase is an enzyme that breaks out fucose.

Fucosidosis is an autosomal recessive lysosomal storage disease caused by defective alpha-L-fucosidase with accumulation of fucose in the tissues. Different phenotypes include clinical features such as neurologic deterioration, growth retardation, visceromegaly, and seizures in a severe early form; coarse facial features, angiokeratoma corporis diffusum, spasticity and delayed psychomotor development in a longer surviving form; and an unusual spondylometaphyseoepiphyseal dysplasia in yet another form.[supplied by OMIM]

== See also ==
- FUCA2
- Fucosidosis
