= Savior sibling =

Child conceived to provide stem cells

A savior baby, savior sibling, or donor baby is a child who is conceived in order to provide a stem cell, bone marrow, or other transplant to a sibling that is affected with a fatal disease, such as cancer or Fanconi anemia, that can best be treated by hematopoietic stem cell, or other transplant.

== Introduction ==
The saviour sibling is conceived through in vitro fertilization. Fertilized zygotes are tested for genetic compatibility (human leukocyte antigen (HLA) typing), using preimplantation genetic diagnosis (PGD), and only zygotes that are compatible with the existing child are implanted. Zygotes are also tested to make sure they are free of the original genetic disease. The procedure is controversial.

== Indications ==
A savior sibling may be the solution for any disease treated by hematopoietic stem cell transplantation. It is effective against genetically detectable (mostly monogenic) diseases, e.g. Fanconi anemia, Diamond–Blackfan anemia and β-thalassemia, in the ailing sibling, since the savior sibling can be selected to not have inherited the disease. The procedure may also be used in children with leukemia, and in such cases HLA match is the only requirement, and not exclusion of any other obvious genetic disorder.

== Procedure ==
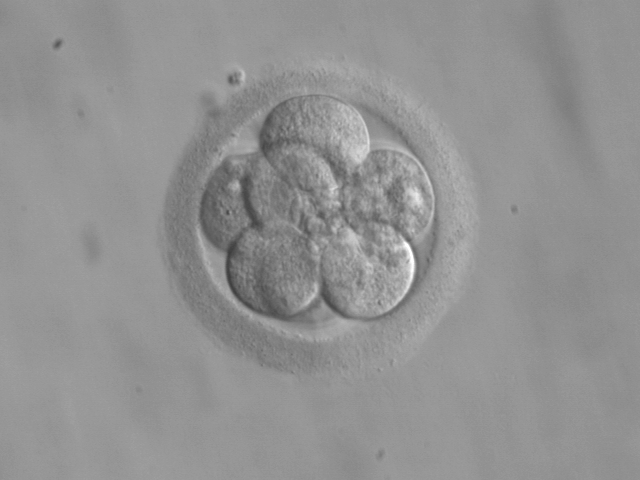
8-cell human embryo, 3 days after fertilization

Multiple embryos are created and preimplantation genetic diagnosis is used to detect and select ones that are free of a genetic disorder and that are also a HLA match for an existing sibling who requires a transplant. Upon birth, umbilical cord blood is taken and used for hematopoietic stem cell transplantation.

== Bioethical concerns ==
Ethical debate surrounds the idea of conceiving a new child in order to save an existing child who will die without a compatible sibling donor.

This debate is reflected in French terminology, with opponents of the practice insisting on the term "bébé médicament" ("medicine baby") to underline the "instrumentalization of the human body". These opponents consider PGD "utilitarianism taken to the extreme", wherein human procreation is perverted to create a human being for medical use.

In 2002, the National Consultative Ethics Committee (CCNE) in France spoke of the "risk of instrumentalization of the unborn child".

French law rejects the concept of the "bébé médicament" but authorizes that of the "enfant du double espoir" ("child of double hope"). In 2009, the CCNE restated its 2002 opinion. According to current French law, this option should only be reserved for couples with a terminally ill child.

Ethical critics argue that this practice instrumentalizes these children in two ways: first, by having them for instrumental reasons rather than for their own sake, and second, by valuing them solely as a means to cure their sick sibling, potentially violating ethical principles like beneficence and nonmaleficence. Supporters, on the other hand, contend that parents' motives should not be condemned, and the key question is how savior siblings are treated after birth. They argue that the Kantian principle prohibiting the use of individuals solely as means to an end does not apply if the savior sibling is also treated as an end in itself. The willingness of parents to go to great lengths to conceive such a child may indicate their dedication to the welfare of all their children.

== Legality ==
- In the United Kingdom, the House of Lords has ruled that it is lawful to use modern reproductive techniques to create a savior sibling.
- In Victoria, Australia, use of PGD for HLA typing is reviewed by the Infertility Treatment Authority on a case-by-case basis.
- In Spain, the Cortes Generales approved the Assisted Reproduction Law in 2006, which authorizes preimplantation diagnosis for therapeutic purposes.
- In France, the bioethics law of 7 July 2011 authorizes the practice of double PGD, going beyond the opinion of the Council of State and thus perpetuating a practice provisionally authorized by the bioethics law of August 2004, including the decree application published in the Official Journal of 23 December 2006.
- In Switzerland, the law on medically assisted reproduction prohibits pre-implantation genetic diagnosis (PGD) and "savior siblings".

== History ==
Yury Verlinsky and collaborators described the first case in 2001: that of Adam Nash, born 29 August 2000.

However, there have been prior instances of parents conceiving a child as a donor for an older sibling; these cases differ in that they predated advances in genetic technology, however, and relied largely on luck that the infant would be a compatible donor. A well-publicized case is the 1991 marrow transplant from Marissa Ayala to her sister Anissa, older by 18 years.

== Challenges and considerations ==
Concerns regarding savior siblings revolve around potential physical and psychological harm. Physically, there are inherent risks associated with the medical technologies involved in conceiving savior siblings, such as in vitro fertilization (IVF), preimplantation genetic diagnosis (PGD), and hematopoietic stem cell (HSC) donation. These risks appear to be relatively low, with IVF being a routine procedure and limited short-term harm observed with PGD and HLA typing. The risks associated with HSC transplantation depend on the source of HSC and collection method, with generally low risks.

However, there is a concern about the possibility of a savior sibling being repeatedly asked to donate HSC, which could potentially harm the child. To address this, legal safeguards can be put in place to limit the number of HSC donations by a child donor.

Psychologically, it has been suggested that savior siblings might experience harm if they discover they were conceived primarily to be an HSC donor for their sick sibling. However, there is insufficient empirical evidence to support this claim. On the contrary, it can be argued that savior siblings may experience psychological benefits from knowing they contributed to helping their ailing sibling, regardless of the transplantation's success. The balance between potential psychological benefits and medical risks remains a subject of debate.

Past studies on pediatric sibling donors of HSC transplantations indicate that the experience varies. In cases of unsuccessful transplantations, some siblings may experience negative emotions, particularly if the failure is linked to the sick sibling's death. Proper information, parental care, emotional support, and attention can help mitigate any potential negative psychological impacts on child donors, including savior siblings. Overall, addressing these concerns involves careful consideration of both the physical and psychological well-being of savior siblings during the decision-making process and throughout their lives.

== Popular culture ==
The novel My Sister's Keeper, later adapted into a film, is about a child who was born as a savior sibling to her sister Kate who is affected by acute promyelocytic leukemia.

In the British soap opera Emmerdale, Debbie Dingle gave birth to her son Jack, who would serve as a savior sibling to his older sister Sarah, who was suffering from Fanconi anemia.

On the popular American show CSI: Crime Scene Investigation, the episode "Harvest" deals with the reported abduction and later murder of a thirteen-year-old girl named Alycia who was later revealed to be a savior sibling for her brother Daniel.

In the American show Heroes, one of the protagonists, Mohinder Suresh, is revealed to have been conceived to cure his sister Shanti of a deadly disease known as the Shanti Virus, although he was ultimately born too late to save her life. His antibodies act as a cure for other patients with the disease throughout the show as well.

On Star Trek: Enterprise, the episode "Similitude" sees a clone created of Trip Tucker for the purpose of organ harvesting. "Sim" is born through the highly controversial use of an alien lifeform.

The novel Never Let Me Go, later adapted into a film, is centred around a dystopian future society where human clones are created and allowed to live to their teenage years before being used for organ harvesting. The films Parts: The Clonus Horror and The Island have a similar premise.

In the Grey's Anatomy episode "I Bet It Stung," the character Donna is a saviour sibling to her older sister Reese.

In the 9-1-1 episode "Buck Begins", it is revealed that Evan "Buck" Buckley was conceived as a savior sibling for his older brother Daniel.

In the Korean drama The Penthouse, the character Anna is adopted by a Korean-American family to be a savior sibling to their son, Logan Lee, who was suffering from bone marrow cancer at the time.

In the light novels of Sword Art Online and their respective anime adaptations, the character Vassago Casals was born from an affair his Japanese father had with a Spanish woman he paid for sexual services. Although Vassago's mother desired to perform an abortion, his father convinced her not to go through with it, as his older son from his actual wife had a congenital kidney defect, hoping that the child could serve as a kidney donor.

== See also ==
- Rainbow baby
