= O-fucosylpeptide 3-beta-N-acetylglucosaminyltransferase =

Class of enzymes

Identifiers
- EC no.: 2.4.1.222
- CAS no.: 299203-70-6

Databases
- IntEnz: IntEnz view
- BRENDA: BRENDA entry
- ExPASy: NiceZyme view
- KEGG: KEGG entry
- MetaCyc: metabolic pathway
- PRIAM: profile
- PDB structures: RCSB PDB PDBe PDBsum
Search
- PMC: articles
- PubMed: articles
- NCBI: proteins

In enzymology, an O-fucosylpeptide 3-beta-N-acetylglucosaminyltransferase (EC 2.4.1.222) is an enzyme that catalyzes the chemical reaction in which a beta-D-GlcNAc residue is transferred from UDP-D-GlcNAc to the fucose residue of a fucosylated protein.

This enzyme belongs to the family of glycosyltransferases, specifically the hexosyltransferases. The systematic name of this enzyme class is UDP-D-GlcNAc:O-L-fucosylpeptide 3-beta-N-acetyl-D-glucosaminyltransferase. This enzyme is also called O-fucosylpeptide beta-1,3-N-acetylglucosaminyltransferase. This enzyme participates in notch signaling pathway.

== Structural studies ==
As of late 2007, two structures have been solved for this class of enzymes, with PDB accession codes 2J0A and 2J0B.
