= Fucoidanase =

Identifiers
- EC no.: 3.2.1.44
- CAS no.: 37288-38-3

Databases
- IntEnz: IntEnz view
- BRENDA: BRENDA entry
- ExPASy: NiceZyme view
- KEGG: KEGG entry
- MetaCyc: metabolic pathway
- PRIAM: profile
- PDB structures: RCSB PDB PDBe PDBsum
Search
- PMC: articles
- PubMed: articles
- NCBI: proteins

== Fucoidanase ==
Fucoidanase (EC 3.2.1.44, alpha-L-fucosidase, poly(1,2-alpha-L-fucoside-4-sulfate) glycanohydrolase) is an enzyme with systematic name poly((1->2)-alpha-L-fucoside-4-sulfate) glycanohydrolase. Fucoidanase is now an obsolete enzyme. It was created in 1972 and deleted in 2020 to narrow the classification of the group of enzymes. The entry has been transferred to two new EC numbers: EC.2.1.211 endo-(1,3)-fucoidanase and EC 3.2.1.212 endo-(1,4)-fucoidanase; the difference being the linkages they target.

The general EC number denotes the group as

3: Hydrolases that cleave bonds by inserting water.

3.2 Glycosylase that break down glycosidic bonds

3.2.1 Glycosidases that hydrolyze O- and S-glycosyl compounds

And the last numbers: 44, 211, 212, that specify the name.

While the enzyme has been made obsolete there are still many studies that refer to fucoidanase EC: 3.2.1.44 broadly. Fucoidanase's are subclassified by catalytic functions and mode of action into groups and are further divided into glycoside hydrolase “GH” families. The following families have been described so far: GH107, GH174, GH187, GH168 with primary focus on GH107 because of its mechanistic similarities to the other families, and potential biotechnical application.

== History/Discovery ==
Fucoidanase is the broad name for enzymes involved in fucoidan hydrolysis and was originally studied in a 1959 study by Yaphe and Morgan investigating pseudomonas atlantica and pseudomonas carrageenovora. The enzyme’s discovery comes well after the discovery of its substrate in 1913 and its bioactive attributes.

Fucose-containing sulfated polysaccharides, known as fucoidans/sulfated fucans, are the substrate of fucoidanase and are involved in cell integrity and defense in brown macroalgae. The fucoidan structure is complex and highly variable as species, season, and extraction method can impact its composition. Its general structure consists of sulfated fucose units making the backbone with sugar residue branches like galactose, glucose, mannose, xylose, rhamnose and glucuronic acid. The primary linkages are ⍺-1,3 linkages and ⍺-1,4 linkages and also vary in location and frequency across species.

== Sources/Organisms ==
Phaeophyceans, brown algae, are the source of fucoidan in marine environments while associated bacteria, algae and fungi contain fucoidanase. There are also notable invertebrates in which fucoidanase has been extracted ie: mollusk, echinoderms, urchins

== Enzyme function in the cell ==
Fucoidanase breaks down complex fucoid sugars into smaller, more bioavailable oligosaccharides. Organisms with the enzyme, primarily heterotrophic marine bacteria, use it to process fucoidan in their metabolic pathways The degradation of this molecule contributes to the symbioses microbes have with the macroalgae that produce it, feeding into a more complex relationship that can be described as the holobiont relationship.

== Structure ==
The structure of fucoidanase matches the variability of the complex sugar it interacts with but a common feature of these enzymes is multi-modularity. As of 2025 seven fucoidanases have been structurally characterized in the GH107 and GH168 family. Of the enzymes with 3D structures they are primarily composed of (𝛽/⍺) 8-barrel domains. These domains are described to have folds consistent with the immunoglobulin superfamily and calcium atoms bound at an apical end. The GH107 family is attractive to researchers structurally because of the differential substrate specificity and high variability in the active site architecture. Advancements in understanding its structure can possibly be translated to other enzymes in closely related families. For example, research using X-ray crystallography and NMR analysis has generated crystal structures of P5FcnA revealing a histidine side chain that acts as an acid/base catalytic residue in a retaining mechanism. Additionally in GH107 enzymes the surface includes grooves and the ability to contort which increases the range of application to other fucoidan sources. There are limited studies investigating the catalytic mechanism of fucoidanase because of the variable characteristics of its substrate.

== Mechanism ==
This enzyme catalyses the following chemical reaction Endohydrolysis of (1->2)-alpha-L-fucoside linkages in fucoidan without release of sulfate. Mechanistically the hydrolysis of fucoidan bonds is catalyzed by the retention of sulfate, the maintained stereochemistry of the sulfate group to the parent molecule during hydrolysis, in fucoidan. In MfFcnA, a GH107 enzyme, it utilizes a hydrolytic mechanism where the side chain Asp acts as a bond forming nucleophile and the His side chains as acid/bases. The residue and the catalytic mechanism are conserved in other GH107 enzymes but the active site is variable to allow for differential substrate specificity.

== Application ==
Fucoidan has been established as having antioxidant, anti-inflammatory, and antibacterial activity making it attractive in the pharmaceutical, cosmetic, health and food based industries.

There is interest in processing natural high molecular weight fucoidan to a lower molecular weight version on industrial scales using fucoidanase. Lower molecular weight improves solubility, absorption rate, and gives fucoidan low viscosity while retaining bioactive properties.

Challenges in characterizing fucoidanase’s structure and mechanisms relates to the culturing paradox of microbes as it is excreted from marine microorganisms that are difficult to isolate and culture. Additionally the complexity of the substrates prevent the determination of clearly defined degradation pathways.
