= Rainbow child =

Rainbow child may refer to:

- Rainbow Child, an album by Lion Babe
- Rainbow children, a pseudoscientific concept about children with supernatural abilities
- Rainbow baby, a child born to a family that has previously experienced child loss
