= C30H44O9 =

The molecular formula C_{30}H_{44}O_{9} (molar mass: 548.66 g/mol, exact mass: 548.2985 u) may refer to:

- Cymarin
- Peruvoside, or cannogenin thevetoside
