= Glycoside hydrolase family 29 =

Alpha-L-fucosidase
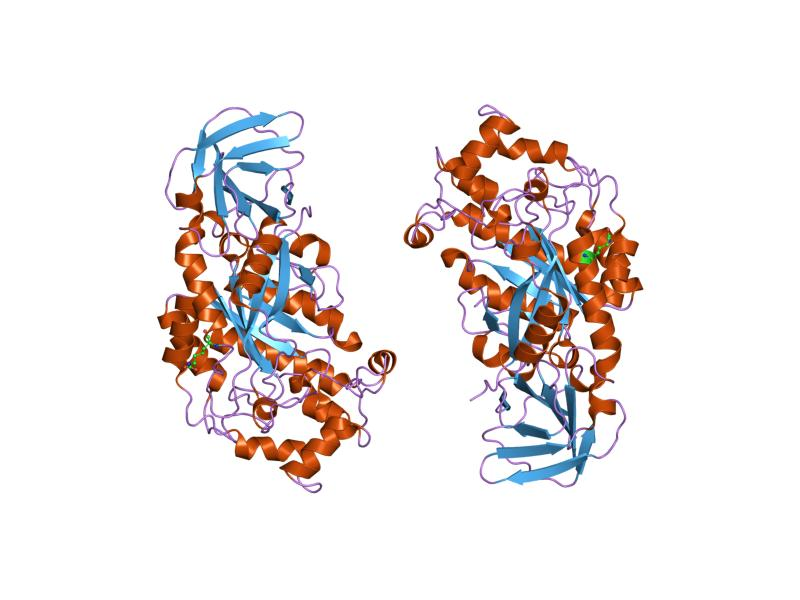
- crystal structure of thermotoga maritima alpha-fucosidase

Identifiers
- Symbol: Alpha_L_fucos
- Pfam: PF01120
- Pfam clan: CL0058
- InterPro: IPR000933
- PROSITE: PDOC00324
- SCOP2: 1hl9 / SCOPe / SUPFAM
- CAZy: GH29
Available protein structures:
- PDB: IPR000933 PF01120 (ECOD; PDBsum)
- AlphaFold: IPR000933; PF01120

In molecular biology, glycoside hydrolase family 29 is a family of glycoside hydrolases.

Glycoside hydrolases EC 3.2.1. are a widespread group of enzymes that hydrolyse the glycosidic bond between two or more carbohydrates, or between a carbohydrate and a non-carbohydrate moiety. A classification system for glycoside hydrolases, based on sequence similarity, has led to the definition of >100 different families. This classification is available on the CAZy web site, and also discussed at CAZypedia, an online encyclopedia of carbohydrate active enzymes.

Glycoside hydrolase family 29 includes alpha-L-fucosidases, They are lysosomal enzymes responsible for hydrolyzing the alpha-1,6-linked fucose joined to the reducing-end N-acetylglucosamine of the carbohydrate moieties of glycoproteins. Alpha-L-fucosidase is responsible for hydrolysing the alpha-1,6-linked fucose joined to the reducing-end N-acetylglucosamine of the carbohydrate moieties of glycoproteins.

Fucosylated glycoconjugates are involved in numerous biological events, making alpha-l-fucosidases, the enzymes responsible for their processing, critically important. Deficiency in alpha-l-fucosidase activity is associated with fucosidosis, a lysosomal storage disorder characterised by rapid neurodegeneration, resulting in severe mental and motor deterioration. The enzyme is a hexamer and displays a two-domain fold, composed of a catalytic (beta/alpha)(8)-like domain and a C-terminal beta-sandwich domain.

Drosophila melanogaster spermatozoa contains an alpha-l-fucosidase that might be involved in fertilisation by interacting with alpha-l-fucose residues on the micropyle of the eggshell. In human sperm, membrane-associated alpha-l-fucosidase is stable for extended periods of time, which is made possible by membrane domains and compartmentalisation. These help preserve protein integrity.
