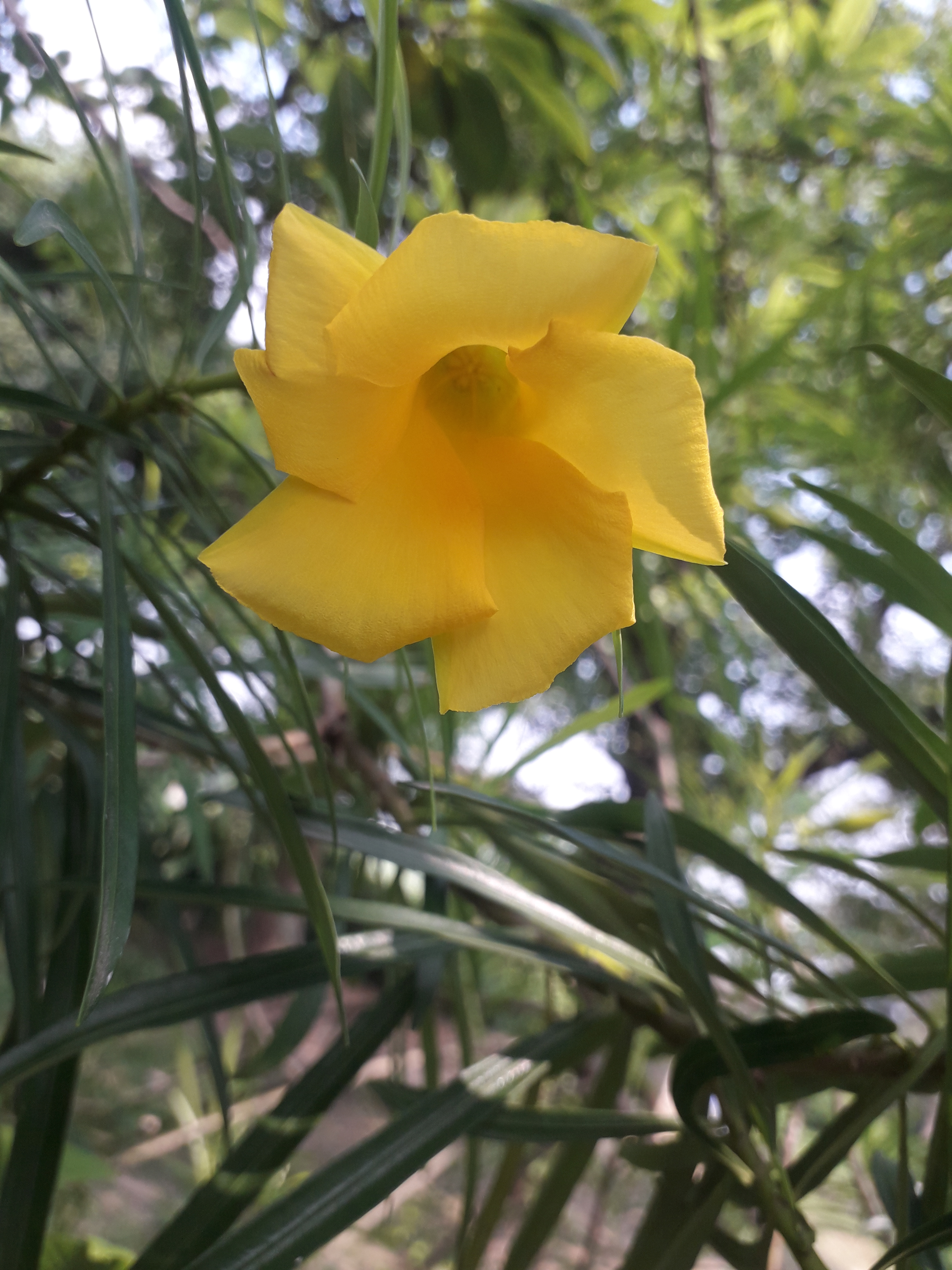
- Flowers and leaves

Conservation status
- Least Concern (IUCN 3.1)

Scientific classification
- Kingdom: Plantae
- Clade: Tracheophytes
- Clade: Angiosperms
- Clade: Eudicots
- Clade: Asterids
- Order: Gentianales
- Family: Apocynaceae
- Subfamily: Rauvolfioideae
- Genus: Cascabela
- Species: C. thevetia

Binomial name
- Cascabela thevetia (L.) Lippold

Synonyms
- Cascabela peruviana (Pers.) Raf.; Cerbera linearifolia Stokes; Cerbera peruviana Pers.; Cerbera thevetia L.; Thevetia linearis Raf.; Thevetia linearis A. DC.; Thevetia neriifolia Juss. ex A.DC.; Thevetia peruviana (Pers.) K.Schum.; Thevetia thevetia (L.) H.Karst. nom. inval.

= Cascabela thevetia =

Species of flowering plant

Cascabela thevetia (syn. Thevetia peruviana) is a species of poisonous plant in the dogbane family Apocynaceae, native throughout Mexico and Central America and cultivated widely as an ornamental. It is a relative of Nerium oleander and thus is known by the common name yellow oleander.

== Etymology ==
The name derives from the Spanish words cascabel, cascavel, or cascabela, which can refer to a small bell, a snake's rattle, or a rattlesnake itself. The name may also allude to the plant's toxicity being comparable to the venom of a rattlesnake. The specific epithet thevetia commemorates André de Thevet (1516–1590), a French Franciscan priest and explorer who explored Brazil and Guiana (where the plant is known as chapéu-de-napoleão, i.e. "Napoleon's hat").

== Description ==
Cascabela thevetia is an evergreen tropical shrub or small tree. Its leaves are willow-like, linear-lanceolate, and glossy green in color. They are covered in a waxy coating to reduce water loss (typical of oleanders). Its stem is green and turns silver/gray as it ages. Flowers bloom from summer to fall. The long, funnel-shaped, sometimes fragrant yellow (less commonly apricot, sometimes white) flowers are in few-flowered terminal clusters. Its fruit is deep red-black in color, encasing a large seed that bears some resemblance to a 'Chinese lucky nut.'

Cascabela thevetia is effectively drought-resistant and tolerant to high temperatures, and hence has been naturalized in various semi-arid regions of India.

== Religious importance ==
Its bright yellow flowers are used for religious purposes in India, including the worship practices of Hindu devotees.

== Toxicity ==
All parts of the C. thevetia plant are toxic to most vertebrates as they contain cardiac glycosides. Many cases of intentional and accidental poisoning of humans are known. Case reports have identified Tecojote root supplements as a source of accidental ingestion of yellow oleander.

The main toxins are the cardenolides thevetin A and thevetin B; others include peruvoside, neriifolin, thevetoxin and ruvoside. These cardenolides are not destroyed by drying or heating and are very similar to digoxin from Digitalis purpurea. They produce gastric upset and cardiotoxic effects, such as an abnormally slow heart rate, EKG abnormalities (scooped ST segments), and abnormally high levels of potassium in the blood. Antidotes include atropine and digoxin immune fabs (antibodies), and treatment may include oral administration of activated charcoal. Ovine polyclonal anti-digitoxin Fab fragment antibody (DigiTAb; Therapeutic Antibodies Inc.) can be used to treat T. peruviana poisoning, but in many countries the cost is prohibitively high.

A few bird species are, however, known to feed on them without any ill effects. These include sunbirds, Asian koel, red-whiskered bulbul, white-browed bulbul, red-vented bulbul, brahminy myna, common myna and common grey hornbill.

In South India and in Sri Lanka, swallowing the seeds of Thevetia peruviana (Kaneru කණේරු (Sinhala), Manjal arali (Tamil)) is one of the preferred methods for suicides in villages where they are grown in abundance.

Extracts from C. thevetia are reported to possess antispermatogenic activity in rats.

In 2023, the US Centers for Disease Control and Prevention (CDC) and Food and Drug Administration (FDA) reported on weight loss supplements which had substituted Crataegus mexicana and Aleurites moluccanus for C. thevetia, following multiple hospitalizations.

== Uses ==
Cultivation

Cascabela thevetia is cultivated as an ornamental plant and is commonly planted as a large flowering shrub or small ornamental tree in gardens and parks in temperate climates. In frost-prone areas it is usually a container plant and in the winter season is brought inside a greenhouse or home as a house plant. It tolerates most soils and is drought-tolerant.

Biological pest control

The plant's toxins have been tested in experiments for uses as a biological pest control. T. peruviana seed oil was used to make a 'paint' with antifungal, antibacterial and anti-termite properties.

== Gallery ==
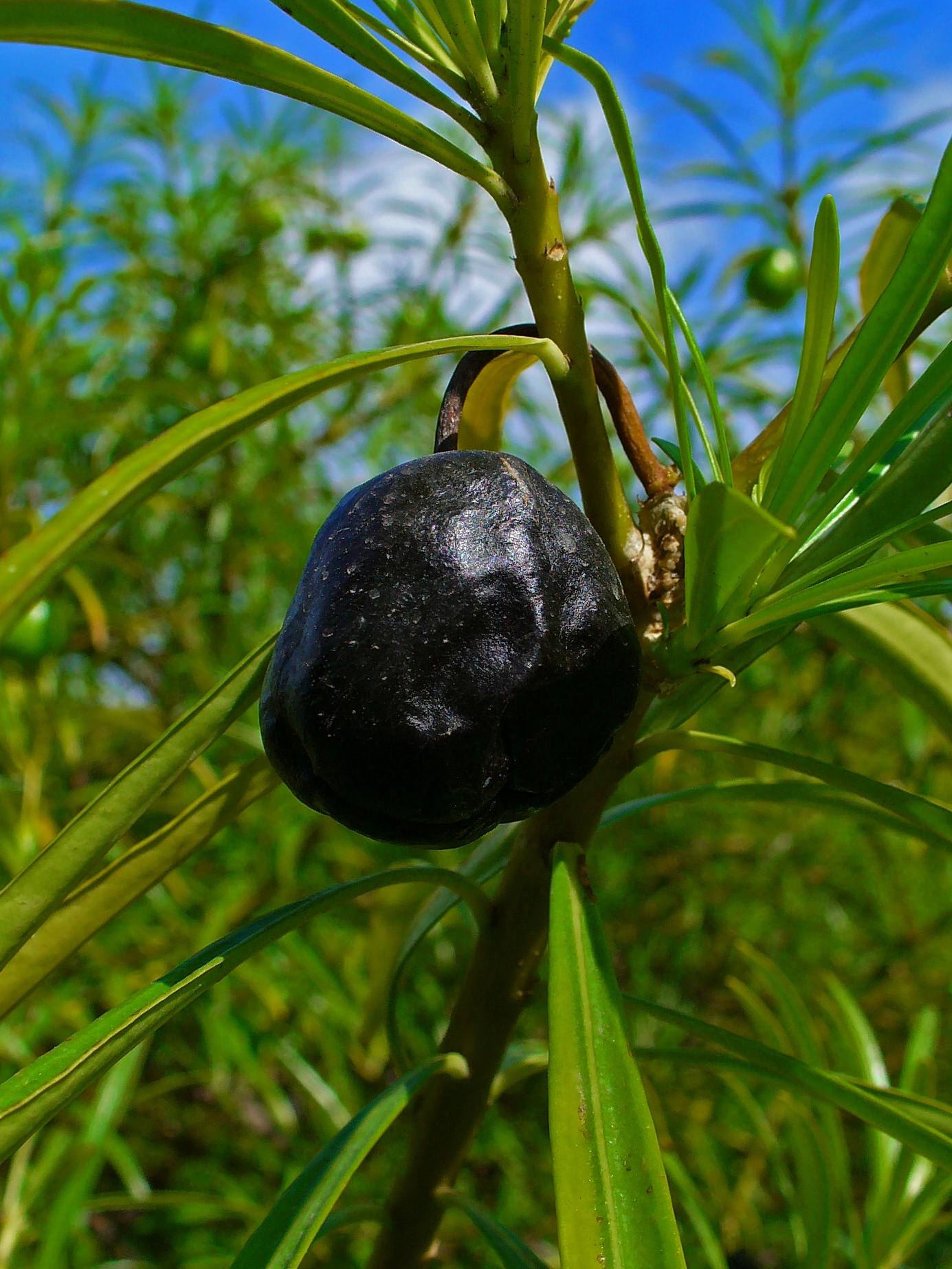
Ripe fruit

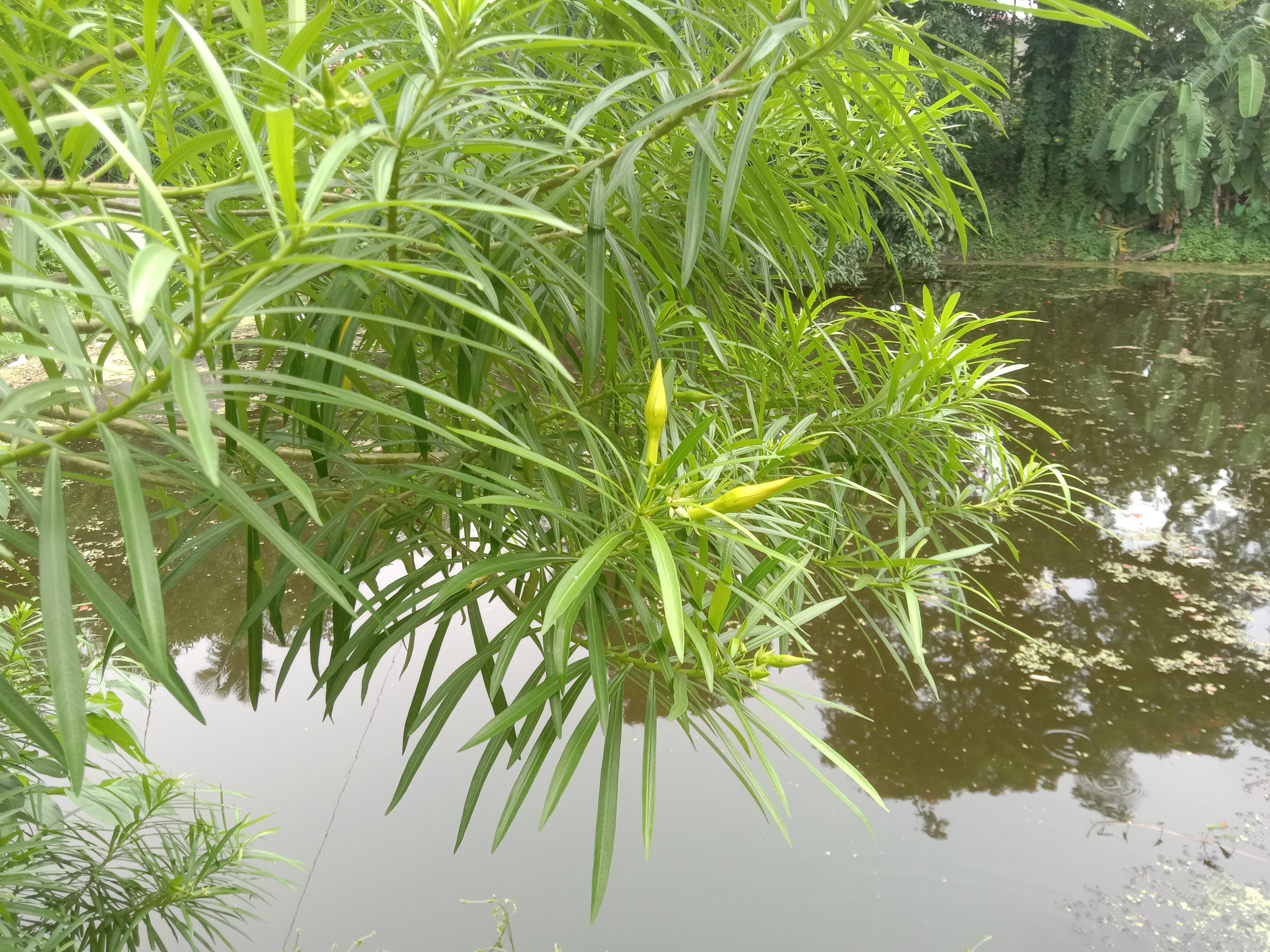
Leaves and buds

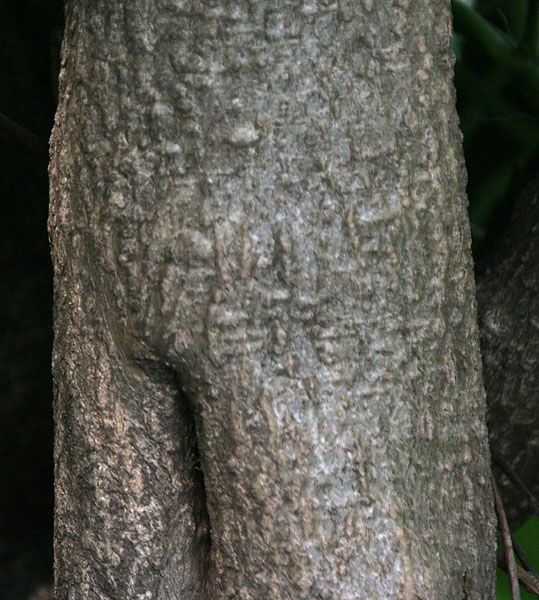
Trunk

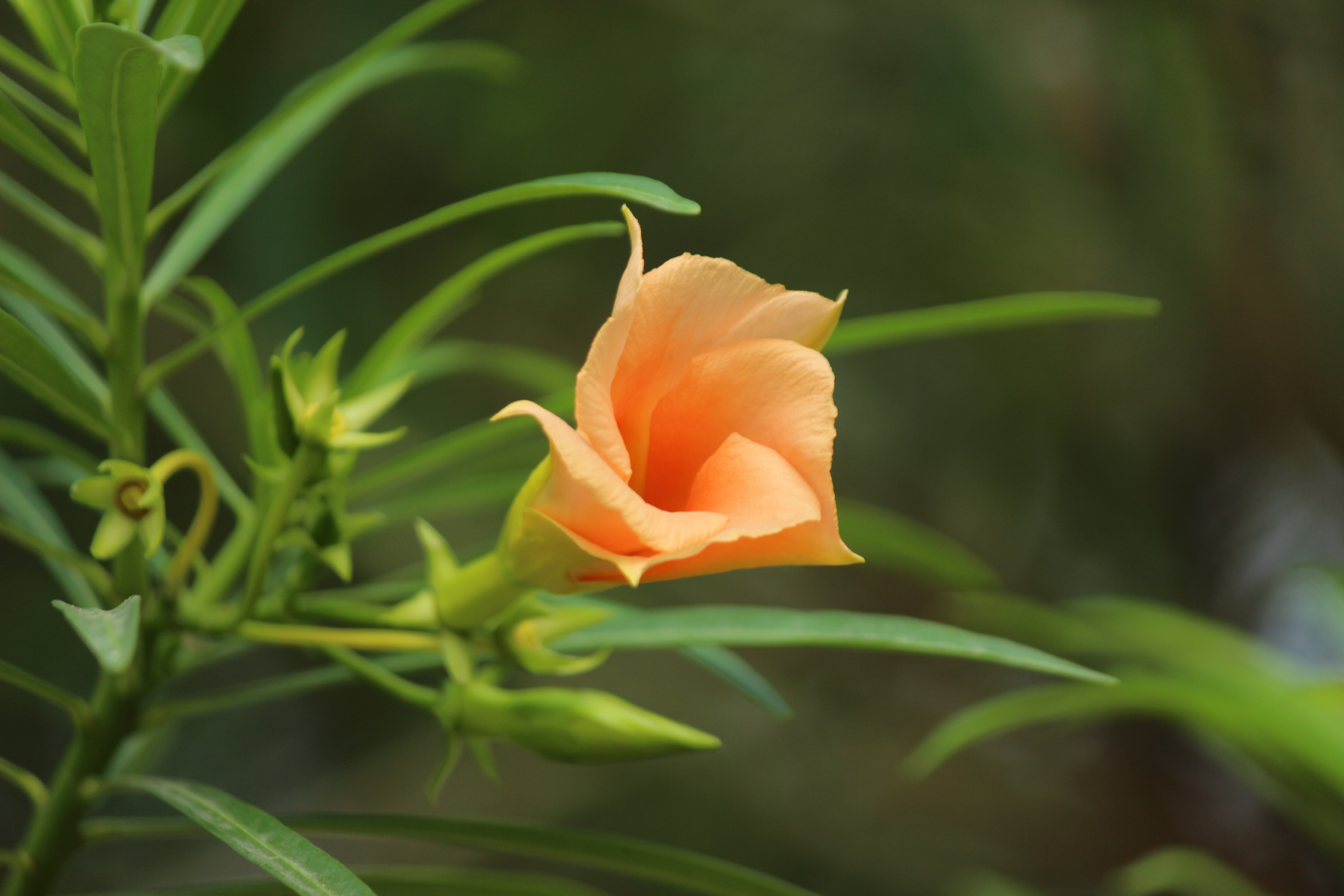
Apricot-colored flower

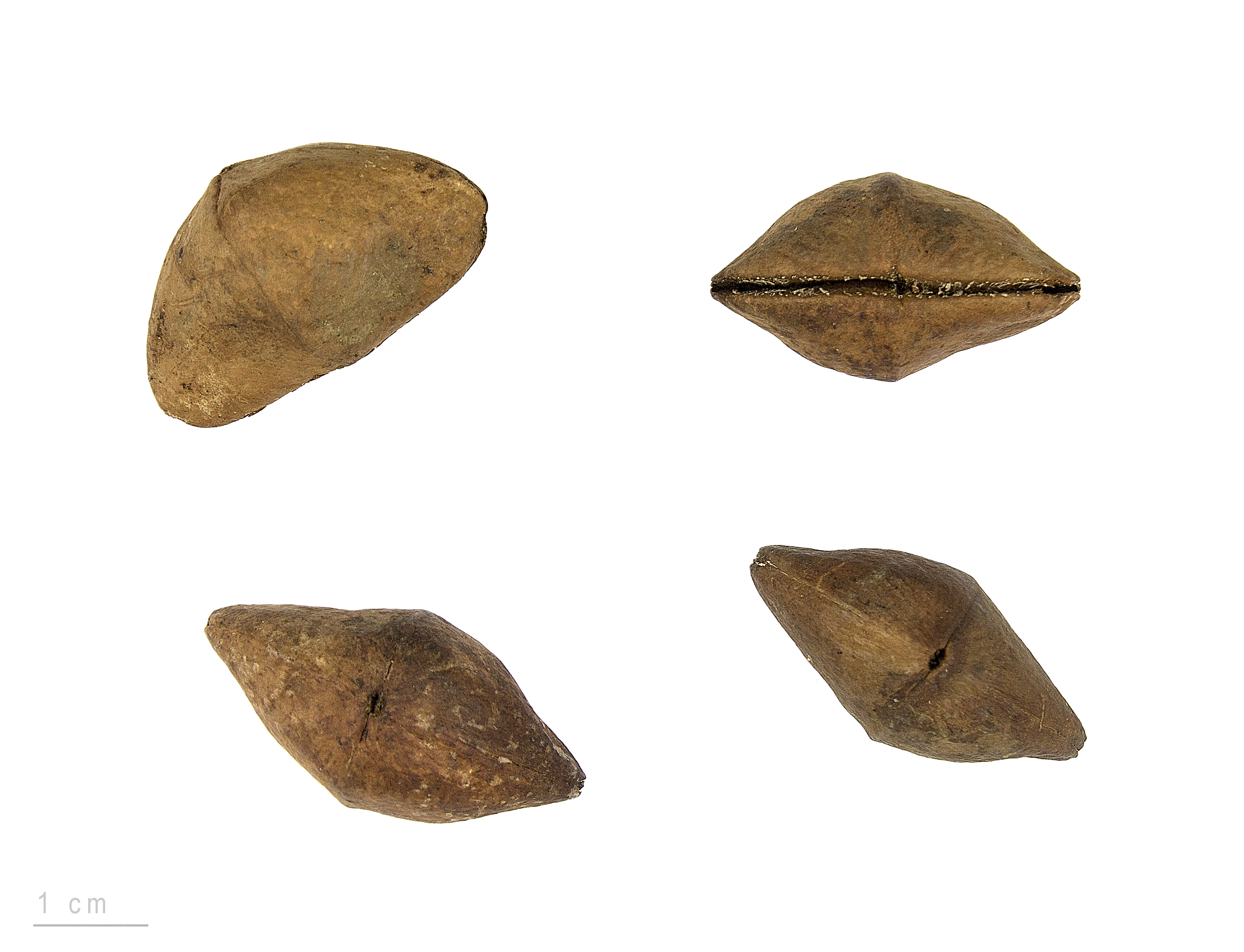
Dry seeds

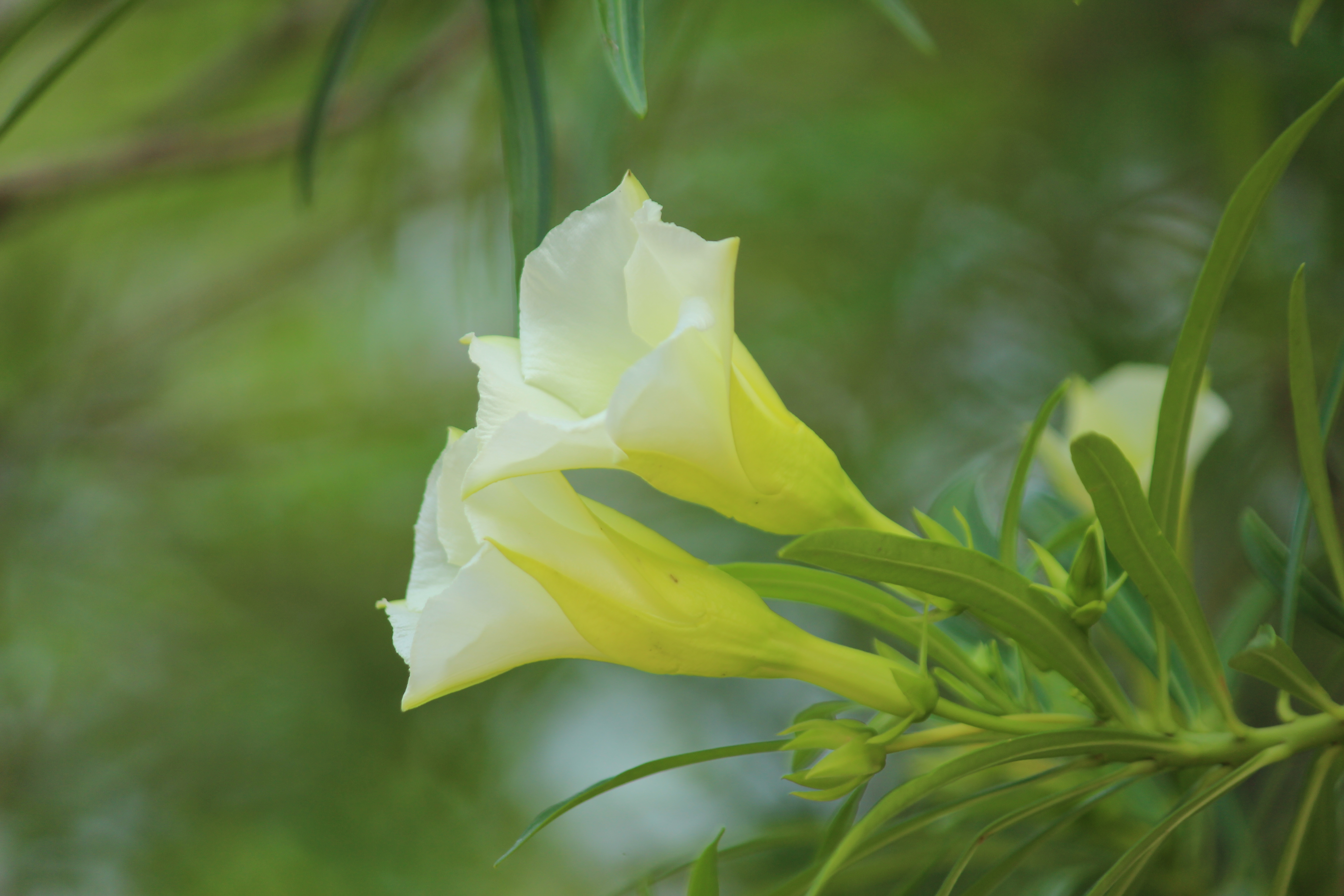
White variety

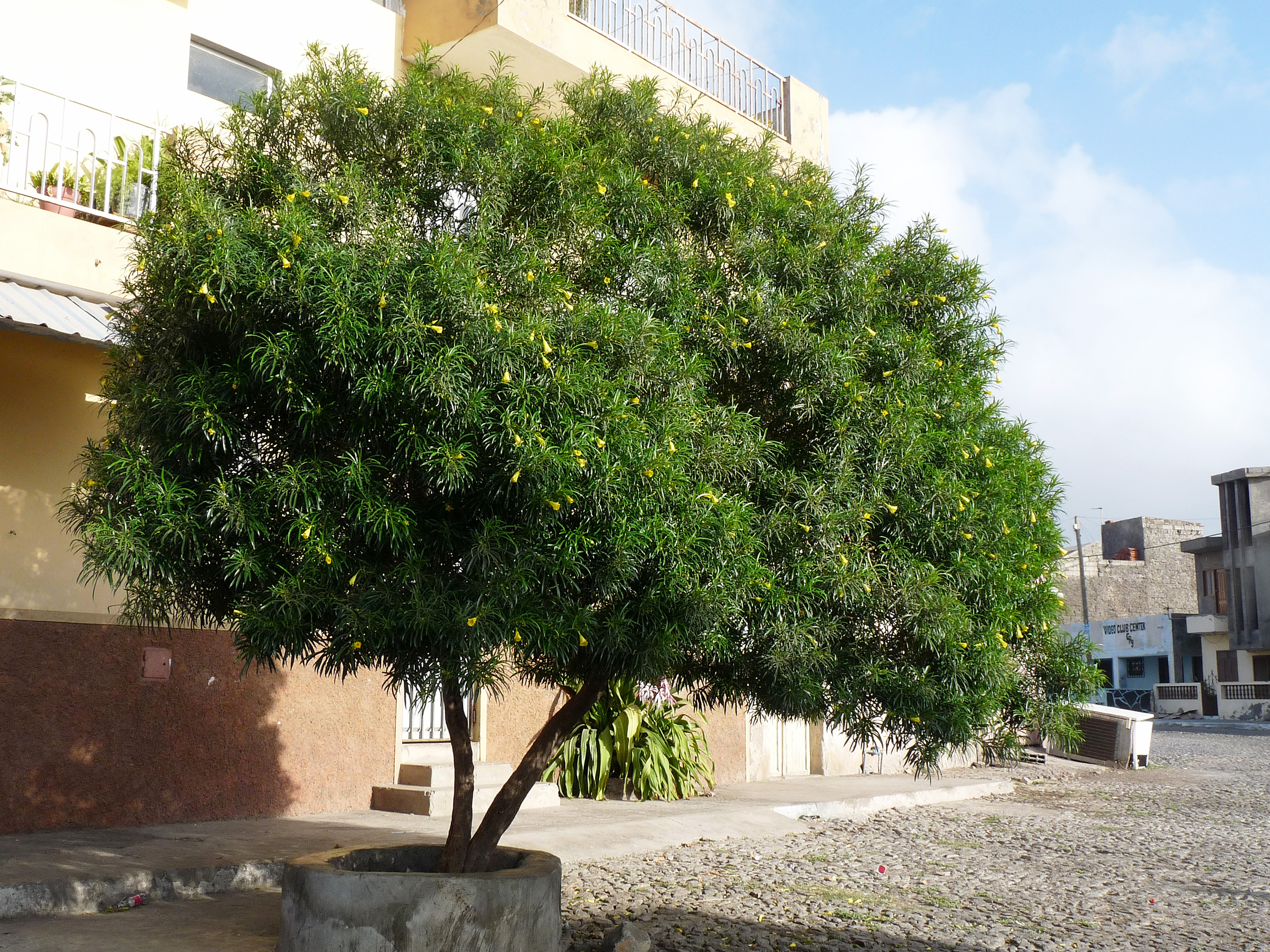
Growth habit
