= Plasmodium tenue =

Scientific classification
- Domain: Eukaryota
- Supergroup: Alveolata
- Phylum: Apicomplexa
- Class: Aconoidasida
- Order: Haemospororida
- Family: Plasmodiidae
- Genus: Plasmodium
- Species: P. tenue

Binomial name
- Plasmodium tenue Stephens, 1914

Species of single-celled organism

Plasmodium tenue is a parasite of the genus Plasmodium subgenus Novyella.

This species is unusual in that the same specific name was used in two distinct papers published in the same year. It is currently thought that the species description by Stephens in man is likely to have been an artifact and that the accepted valid species is the one described from birds.

This name still occurs in the literature for species found in humans that look atypical. It is a member of the subgenus Novyella.

Further adding to the confusion concerning this species, it is sometimes referred to as Plasmodium tenuis.

== Taxonomy ==
This species was first described by Stephens in 1914. The same name was used by Laveran and Marullaz also in 1914 which described this species in a babbler (Leiothrix lutea).

== Description ==
The bird species usually produces 4 merozoites per segmenter, but often as many as 6; rarely it gives rise to only 2 - 3. The gametocytes are elongate. Neither sexual nor asexual stages displace the host cell nucleus

== Hosts ==
The known hosts of this species include the babblers Leiothrix lutea and Garrulax canorus taewanus.
