= Novyella =

Scientific classification
- Domain: Eukaryota
- Clade: Diaphoretickes
- Clade: SAR
- Clade: Alveolata
- Phylum: Apicomplexa
- Class: Aconoidasida
- Order: Haemospororida
- Family: Plasmodiidae
- Genus: Plasmodium
- Subgenus: Novyella; Corradetti et al., 1963

Species
- See text

Subgenus of single-celled organisms

Novyella is a subgenus of the genus Plasmodium - all of which are parasites. The subgenus was created in 1963 by Corradetti et al. Species in this subgenus infect birds. It unites the avian malaria parasites with small erythrocytic meronts and elongated gametocytes.

== Taxonomy ==
This subgenus was created on the basis of morphology. Subsequent DNA studies showed it to be polyphetic. Its definition has been revised by Landau et al to contain only those species with a white/blue globule in the cytoplasm. Several of the species that were included in this subgenus have now been moved to a new subgenus Papernaia.

=== Species ===
The type species is Plasmodium vaughani.

- Plasmodium accipiteris Paperna & Landau, 2007
- Plasmodium bambusicolai
- Plasmodium corradettii
- Plasmodium delichoni
- Plasmodium dissanaike De Jong, 1971
- Plasmodium globularis Valkiūnas et al., 2008
- Plasmodium homonucleophilum
- Plasmodium jiangi
- Plasmodium kempi Christensen et al., 1983
- Plasmodium lucens
- Plasmodium megaglobularis Valkiūnas et al., 2008
- Plasmodium merulae Corradetti & Scanga, 1972
- Plasmodium mohammedi Paperna et al., 2008
- Plasmodium multivacuolaris Valkiūnas et al., 2009
- Plasmodium nucleophilum toucani syn. P. n. tucani Manwell & Sessler, 1971
- Plasmodium pachysomum Paperna et al., 2008
- Plasmodium papernai
- Plasmodium parahexamerium Valkiūnas et al., 2009
- Plasmodium paranucleophilum
- Plasmodium stellatum Paperna et al., 2008
- Plasmodium tenue
- Plasmodium tenuis (Laveran & Marullaz, 1914)
- Plasmodium unalis
- Plasmodium vaughani Novy & McNeal, 1904

== Description ==
Species in the subgenus Novyella have the following characteristics:

- Mature schizonts are either smaller than or only slightly larger than the host nucleus. They contain scanty cytoplasm.
- Gametocytes are elongated. Sexual stages in this subgenus resemble those of Haemoproteus.
- Exoerythrocytic schizogony occurs in the mononuclear phagocyte system
- A blue, pale blue or white globule, frequently refractory, can be found in the cytoplasm.
