= Fucitol =

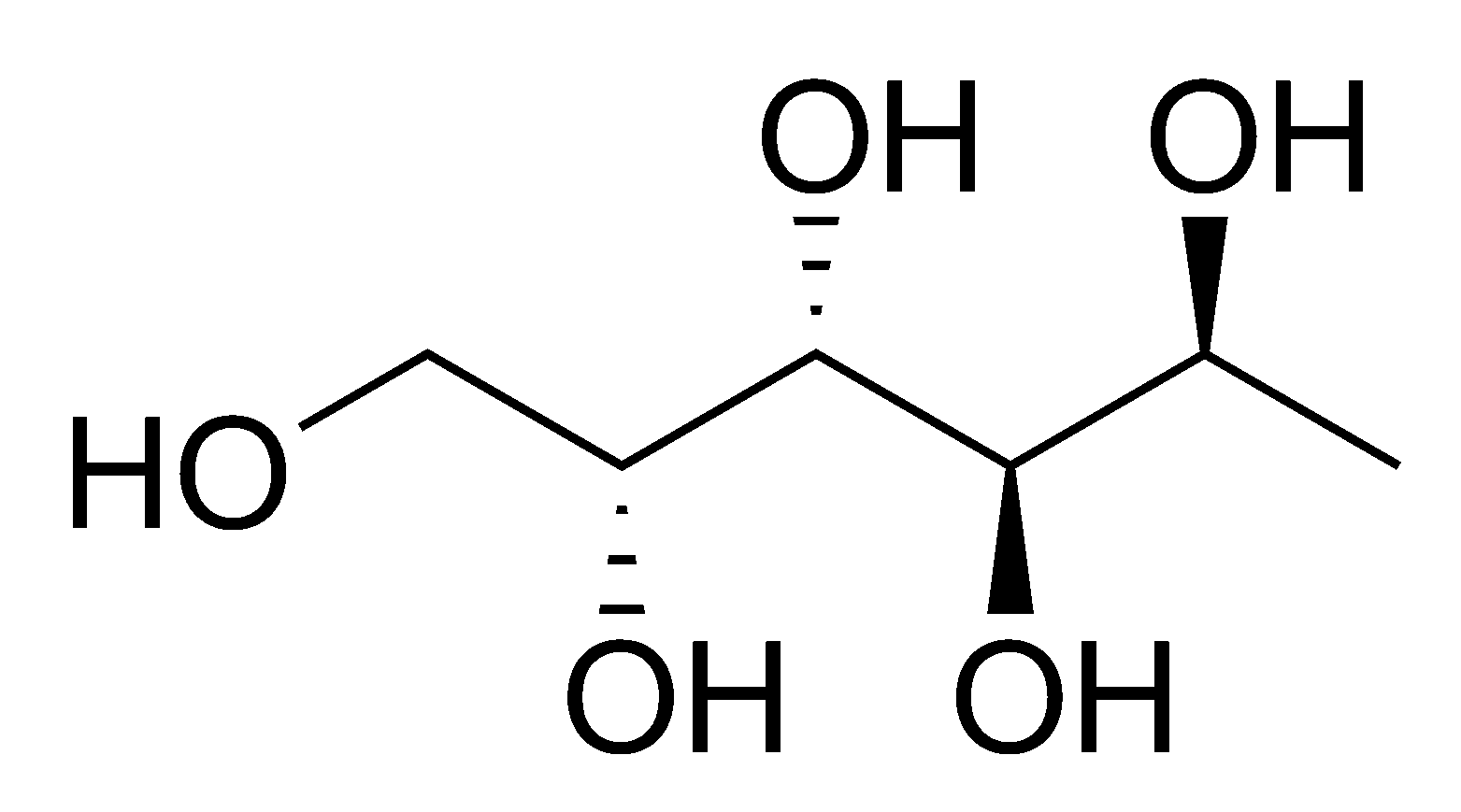

Names
- IUPAC name 1-Deoxy-L-galactitol
- Systematic IUPAC name (2R,3S,4R,5S)-Hexane-1,2,3,4,5-pentol

Identifiers
CAS Number	13074-06-1 (L); 5328-43-8 (D); 37114-30-0 (DL)
3D model (JSmol)	Interactive image
ChEBI	CHEBI:42600
ChemSpider	26329719 (L); 393279 (D)
PubChem CID	445724
UNII	961570X3WO (L)
CompTox Dashboard (EPA)	DTXSID201318579
- InChI: InChI=1S/C6H14O5/c1-3(8)5(10)6(11)4(9)2-7/h3-11H,2H2,1H3/t3-,4+,5-,6-/m0/s1 Key: SKCKOFZKJLZSFA-FSIIMWSLSA-N
- SMILES: C[C@H](O)[C@@H](O)[C@@H](O)[C@H](O)CO

Properties
Chemical formula	C_{6}H_{14}O_{5}
Molar mass	166.17 g/mol
Melting point	153 to 154 °C (307 to 309 °F; 426 to 427 K)

Supplementary data page
- Fucitol (data page)
- Except where otherwise noted, data are given for materials in their standard state (at 25 °C [77 °F], 100 kPa). verify (what is ?) Infobox references

Fucitol, also known as L-fucitol, 1-deoxy-L-galactitol, and (2R,3S,4R,5S)-hexane-1,2,3,4,5-pentol, is a sugar alcohol derived from fucoidan which is found in the North Atlantic seaweed Fucus vesiculosus or by the reduction of fucose.

== See also ==
- Galactitol
