= Fucose (data page) =

Chemical data page

The complete data for Fucose
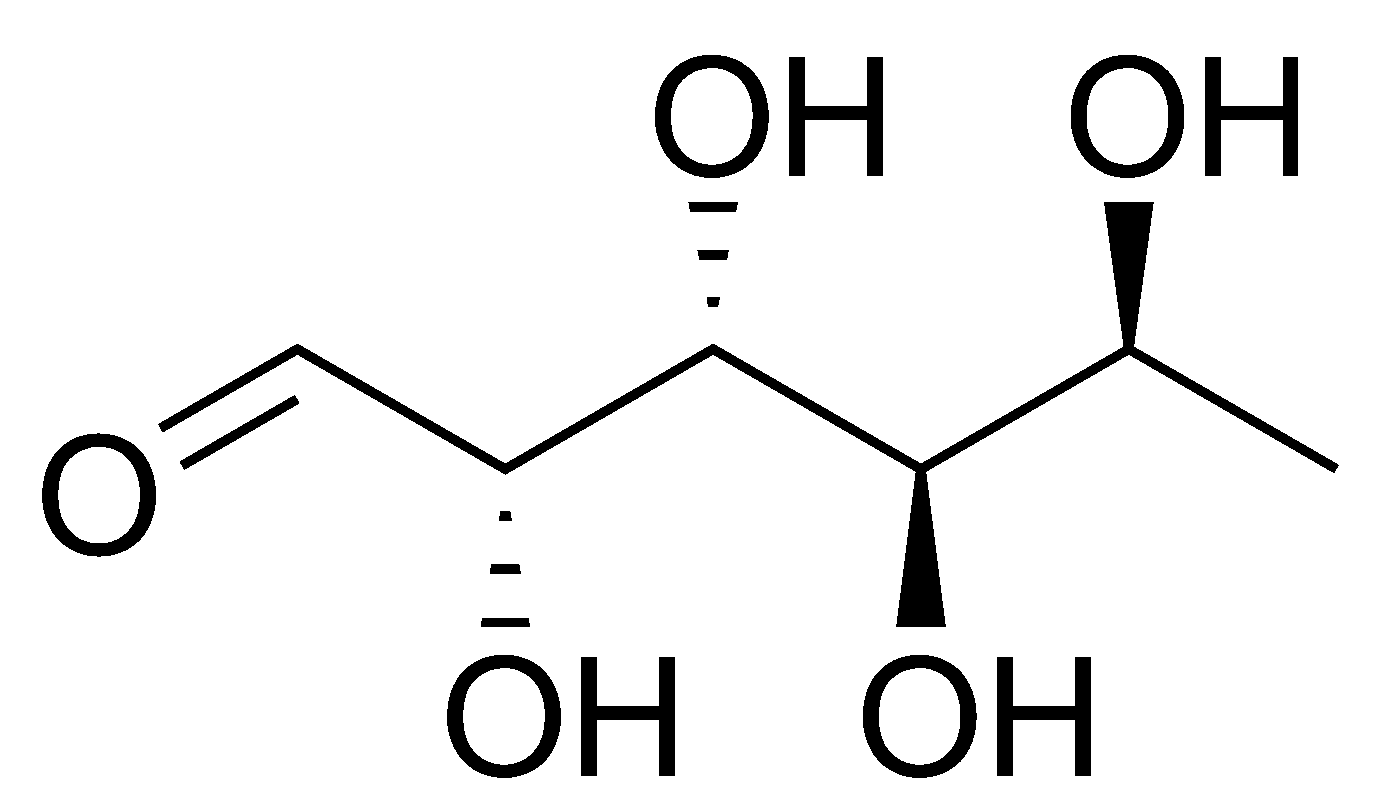
General information
Chemical formula: C_{6}H_{12}O_{5}
Molar mass: 164.16 g·mol^{−1}
Systematic name:
(3S,4R,5R,6S)-6-methyloxane-2,3,4,5-tetrol
Abbreviations: Fuc
Synonyms:
6-deoxy-L-galactose
6-deoxy-L-galactopyranose
6-methyltetrahydropyran-2,3,4,5-tetraol
L-fucopyranose
Database data
SMILES: C[C@H]1[C@H]([C@H]([C@@H](C(O1)O)O)O)O
InChI=1/C6H12O5/c1-2-3(7)4(8)5(9)6(10)11-2/h2-10H,1H3/t2-,3+,4+,5-,6?/m0/s1

ATC: N/A	CAS: 17-10-6 (L)	DrugBank: N/A	EINECS: 219-452-7 ^{a}	PubChem: 17106 ^{a}

Physical properties

Structure	Crystal data	Spectral data: UV-Vis / IR / NMR / MS

Phase behavior	Solid properties T_{m}: 144 °C	Liquid properties	Gas properties

Hazard properties

MSDS N/A	Main hazards: N/A	NFPA 704	Flash point: N/A	RTECS number: N/A

Chemical properties

XLogP: -2.285	pI:	pK_{a}:	Tautomers:	Hydrogen bond: donor - 4; acceptor - 5

Pharmacological properties

This box:
- Except where noted otherwise, data relate to Standard temperature and pressure.
- Reliability of data general note.
