= Β-D-Fucosidase =

Enzyme

β-D-Fucosidase

Identifiers
- EC no.: 3.2.1.38
- CAS no.: 9025-34-7

Databases
- IntEnz: IntEnz view
- BRENDA: BRENDA entry
- ExPASy: NiceZyme view
- KEGG: KEGG entry
- MetaCyc: metabolic pathway
- PRIAM: profile
- PDB structures: RCSB PDB PDBe PDBsum
Search
- PMC: articles
- PubMed: articles
- NCBI: proteins

β-D-Fucosidase (EC 3.2.1.38, β-fucosidase) is an enzyme with systematic name β-D-fucoside fucohydrolase. This enzyme catalyses the following chemical reaction

Hydrolysis of terminal non-reducing β-D-fucose residues in β-D-fucosides

Enzymes from some sources also hydrolyse β-D-galactosides, β-D-glucosides and α-L-arabinosides.
