= Fucitol (data page) =

Chemical data page

The complete data for Fucitol
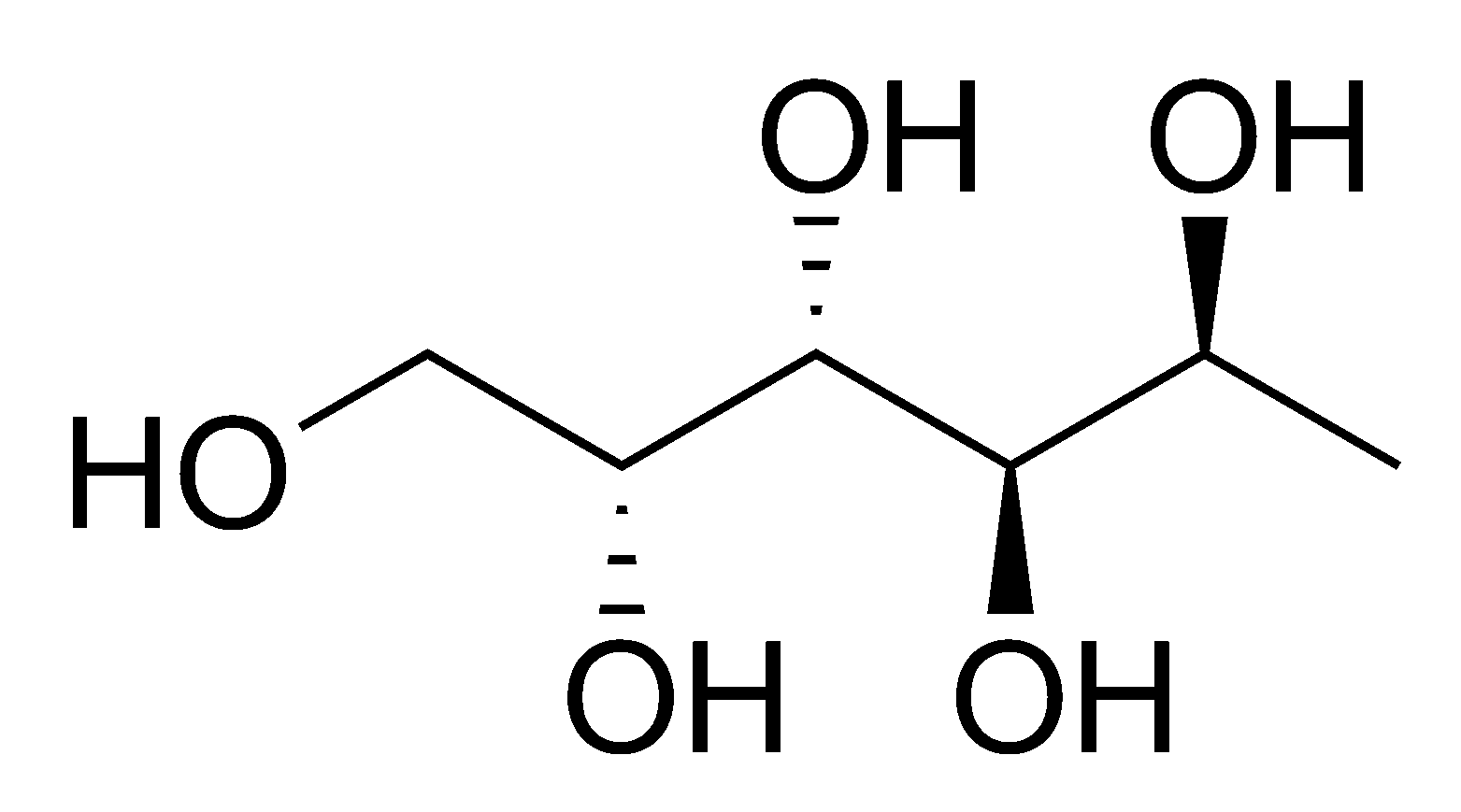
General information
Chemical formula: C_{6}H_{14}O_{5}
Molar mass: 166.172 g·mol^{−1}
Systematic name:
hexane-1,2,3,4,5-pentol
Synonyms:
1-deoxy-D-altritol
1-deoxy-D-mannitol
1-deoxyhexitol
1-desoxy-D-mannitol
6-desoxy-L-altritol
6-desoxy-L-gulitol
Database data
SMILES: CC(C(C(C(CO)O)O)O)O
InChI=1/C6H14O5/c1-3(8)5(10)6(11)4(9)2-7/h3-11H,2H2,1H3

ATC: N/A	CAS: 13074-06-1 (L).	DrugBank: N/A	EINECS: N/A	PubChem: 3429 ^{a}

Physical properties

Structure	Crystal data	Spectral data: UV-Vis / IR / NMR / MS

Phase behavior	Solid properties	Liquid properties	Gas properties

Hazard properties

MSDS N/A	Main hazards: N/A	NFPA 704	Flash point: N/A	RTECS number: N/A

Chemical properties

XLogP: -2.279	pI:	pK_{a}:	Tautomers:	Hydrogen bond: donor - 5; acceptor - 5

Pharmacological properties

This box:
- Except where noted otherwise, data relate to Standard temperature and pressure.
- Reliability of data general note.
