= Plasmodium jiangi =

Scientific classification
- Domain: Eukaryota
- Clade: Sar
- Clade: Alveolata
- Phylum: Apicomplexa
- Class: Aconoidasida
- Order: Haemospororida
- Family: Plasmodiidae
- Genus: Plasmodium
- Species: P. jiangi

Binomial name
- Plasmodium jiangi He and Huang, 1993

Species of single-celled organism

Plasmodium jiangi is a parasite of the genus Plasmodium subgenus Novyella. As in all Plasmodium species, P. jiangi has both vertebrate and insect hosts. The vertebrate hosts for this parasite are birds.

== Distribution ==
This species occurs in China.

== Hosts ==
The only known host of this species is the red-whiskered bulbul (Pycnonotus jocosus).
