= Α-L-fucosidase =

α-L-Fucosidase
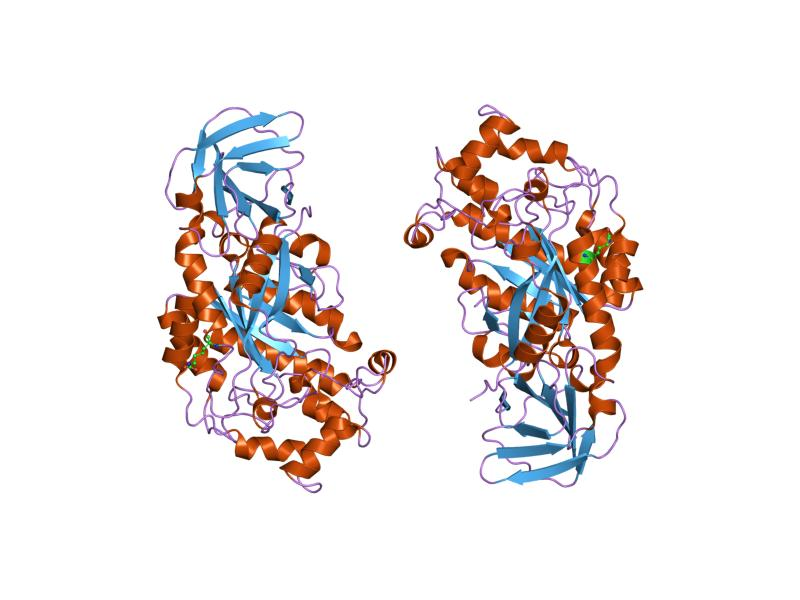
- crystal structure of Thermotoga maritima α-fucosidase

Identifiers
- Symbol: α
- Pfam: PF01120
- Pfam clan: CL0058
- InterPro: IPR000933
- PROSITE: PDOC00324
- SCOP2: 1hl9 / SCOPe / SUPFAM
- CAZy: GH29
Available protein structures:
- PDB: IPR000933 PF01120 (ECOD; PDBsum)
- AlphaFold: IPR000933; PF01120

α-L-fucosidase

Identifiers
- EC no.: 3.2.1.51
- CAS no.: 9037-65-4

Databases
- BRENDA: enzyme data
- ExPASy: NiceZyme view
- KEGG: enzyme entry
- MetaCyc: metabolic pathway
- Rhea: reactions
- PDB structures: RCSB PDB PDBe PDBsum
- Gene Ontology: AmiGO / QuickGO
Search
- PMC: articles
- PubMed: articles
- NCBI: proteins

The enzyme α-L-fucosidase (EC 3.2.1.51) catalyzes the following chemical reaction: an α-L-fucoside + H_{2}O $\rightleftharpoons$ L-fucose + an alcohol

This enzyme belongs to the family of hydrolases, specifically those glycosidases that hydrolyse O- and S-glycosyl compounds. The systematic name of this enzyme class is α-L-fucoside fucohydrolase. This enzyme is also called α-fucosidase. It participates in N-glycan degradation and glycan structure degradation.

Deficiency of this enzyme is called fucosidosis.

In CAZy, α-L-fucosidases are found in glycoside hydrolase family 29 and glycoside hydrolase family 95.

== Structural studies ==
As of late 2007, 3 structures have been solved for this class of enzymes, with PDB accession codes PDB: 1HL8, PDB: 1HL9, and PDB: 1ODU.

== Human medical studies ==
It was in a recent study by Endreffy, Bjørklund and collaborators (2017) found an association between the activity of α-L-fucosidase-1 (FUCA-1) and chronic autoimmune disorders in children. This should encourage further research on FUCA-1 as a marker of chronic inflammation and autoimmunity. Recently, there have been focus on various engineering strategies to make fucosynthase to fucosidase.

== See also ==
- 1,2-α-L-fucosidase
- 1,3-α-L-fucosidase
- 1,6-α-L-fucosidase
- FUCA1
- FUCA2
