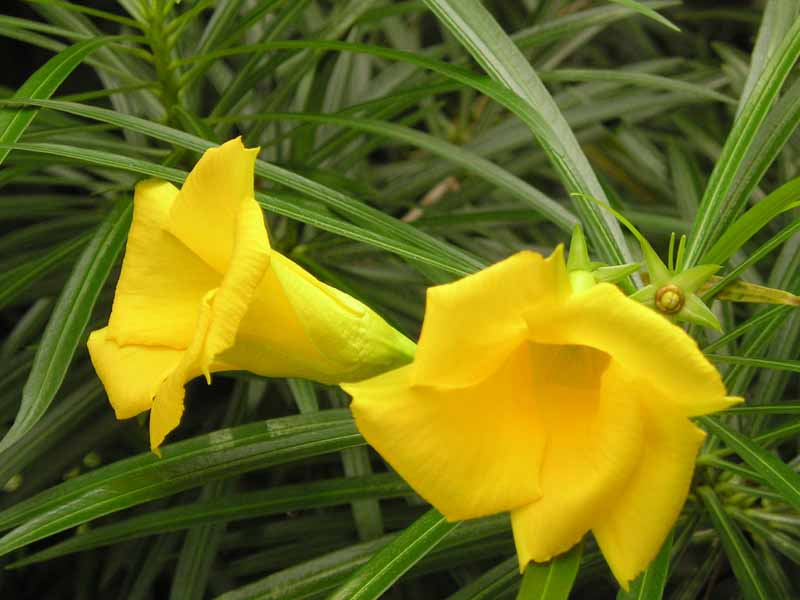
- Cascabela thevetia

Scientific classification
- Kingdom: Plantae
- Clade: Tracheophytes
- Clade: Angiosperms
- Clade: Eudicots
- Clade: Asterids
- Order: Gentianales
- Family: Apocynaceae
- Subfamily: Rauvolfioideae
- Genus: Cascabela; Raf.

Type species
- Cascabela peruviana (syn of C. thevetia) (Pers.) Raf.

= Cascabela =

Genus of flowering plants

Cascabela is a genus of flowering plants in the dogbane family, Apocynaceae. It is native to Mexico, Central America, and South America.

== Species ==
As of November 2023, Plants of the World Online accepted the following species:

- Cascabela balsaensis L.O.Alvarado & J.C.Soto – Michoacán in Mexico
- Cascabela gaumeri (Hemsl.) Lippold - Veracruz, Tabasco, Yucatán Peninsula, Belize, Guatemala, Honduras, Nicaragua, Costa Rica
- Cascabela ovata (Cav.) Lippold - Central America, much of Mexico
- Cascabela pinifolia (Standl. & Steyerm.) L.O.Alvarado & Ochot.-Booth - C + S Mexico
- Cascabela thevetia (L.) Lippold - Latin America from N Mexico to NE Argentina
- Cascabela thevetioides (Kunth) Lippold - Mexico
