= Thevetin =

Thevetins are a group of poisonous cardiac glycosides. They are obtained especially from the seeds of a West Indian shrub or small tree (Cascabela thevetia syn. Thevetia nereifolia) of the dogbane family (Apocynaceae). Hydrolysis products include glucose, digitalose, and a sterol.

Thevetin A (C_{42}H_{64}O_{19})

Thevetin B (C_{42}H_{66}O_{18})
