= Plasmodium homonucleophilum =

Scientific classification
- Domain: Eukaryota
- Clade: Sar
- Clade: Alveolata
- Phylum: Apicomplexa
- Class: Aconoidasida
- Order: Haemospororida
- Family: Plasmodiidae
- Genus: Plasmodium
- Species: P. homonucleophilum

Binomial name
- Plasmodium homonucleophilum Ilgūnas et al., 2013

Species of single-celled organism

Plasmodium homonucleophilum is a parasitic apicomplexan of the genus Plasmodium, subgenus Novyella whose parasitic hosts are birds.

== Taxonomy ==
Plasmodium homonucleophilum was described by Ilgūnas et al. in 2013.

== Distribution ==
Plasmodium homonucleophilum has been found in Europe, Africa and Asia

== Hosts ==
Plasmodium homonucleophilum has been found infecting twelve families of birds. Its known hosts are the great reed warbler (Acrocephalus arundinaceus), the Blyth's reed warbler (Acrocephalus dumetorum), the aquatic warbler (Acrocephalus paludicola), the Sedge warbler (Acrocephalus schoenobaenus), the Eurasian reed warbler (Acrocephalus scirpaceus), the Eurasian skylark (Alauda arvensis), the mallard (Anas platyrhynchos), the grey heron (Ardea cinerea), the cork crane (Crex crex), the Eurasian blue tit (Cyanistes caeruleus), the black-faced bunting (Emberiza spodocephala), the common moorhen (Gallinula chloropus), the white-naped crane (Grus vipio), the common grasshopper warbler (Locustella naevia), the bluethroat (Luscinia svecica), the great tit (Parus major), the great cormorant (Phalacrocorax carbo), the little crake (Porzana parva), the water rail (Rallus aquaticus), the whinchat (Saxicola rubetra), the tawny owl (Strix aluco) and the common greenshank (Tringa nebularia).

== Vectors ==
The vector of P. homonucleophilum has not been strictly identified yet, although this parasite was found in the thorax of unfed Culex pipiens mosquitoes sampled in Switzerland.
