= Red-whiskered bulbul =

- Pycnonotus jocosus in Wayanad, Kerala, India

Conservation status
- Least Concern (IUCN 3.1)

Scientific classification
- Kingdom: Animalia
- Phylum: Chordata
- Class: Aves
- Order: Passeriformes
- Family: Pycnonotidae
- Genus: Pycnonotus
- Species: P. jocosus

Binomial name
- Pycnonotus jocosus (Linnaeus, 1758)

Synonyms
- Lanius jocosus Linnaeus, 1758

Species of bird

The red-whiskered bulbul (Pycnonotus jocosus), or crested bulbul, is a passerine bird native to Asia. It is a member of the bulbul family. It is a resident frugivore found mainly in tropical Asia. It has been introduced in many tropical areas of the world where populations have established themselves. It has a loud three or four note call, feeds on fruits and small insects and perches conspicuously on trees. It is common in hill forests and urban gardens.

== Taxonomy ==
The red-whiskered bulbul was scientifically described by Carl Linnaeus in 1758 under the binomial name Lanius jocosus. Linnaeus based his description on the Sitta chinensis that had been described by Pehr Osbeck in 1757. Linnaeus specified the location as "China" but this was restricted to Hong Kong and Guangdong by Herbert Girton Deignan in 1948. The red-whiskered bulbul is now placed in the genus Pycnonotus that was proposed by Friedrich Boie in 1826.

The specific epithet is from Latin ioculus meaning "merry", from iocus meaning "joke".

=== Subspecies ===
Nine subspecies are recognised:

Subspecies	Image	Range	Notes
P. j. fuscicaudatus (Gould, 1866)	Windermere Estate, Kerala, India	Southwestern and central India (Tapti River to Kerala and northern Madras).	Nearly complete breast band, and no white tail tip. Protonym Otocompsa fuscicaudata.
P. j. abuensis (Whistler, 1931)		Western India (Bombay to southwestern Rajasthan; type locality Mount Abu).	Pale with a broken breast band, and no white tail tip. Protonym Otocompsa jocosa abuensis.
P. j. pyrrhotis (Bonaparte, 1850)	Chitwan National Park, Nepal	Terai lowlands of Nepal and northern India (eastern Punjab to Bihar).	Pale above with white tail tip and a widely separated breast band. Protonym Ixos pyrrhotis.
P. j. emeria (Linnaeus, 1758)	Satchari National Park, Bangladesh	Lowlands of eastern India to Myanmar and southwestern Thailand. Introduced in Florida.	Warm brown plumage above with a slim bill and a long crest and white tail tip. Protonym Motacilla emeria.
P. j. whistleri Deignan, 1948	Port Blair, Andamans, India	Andaman Islands.	Warm brown plumage above, a heavier bill and a shorter crest than P. j. emeria.
P. j. monticola (Horsfield, 1840)	Kaziranga, Assam, India	Eastern Himalaya from Sikkim to northern Myanmar and southwestern China (Yunnan).	Darker upperparts than P. j. pyrrhotis; lacks red whisker. Protonym Ixos monticola.
P. j. jocosus (Linnaeus, 1758)	Kowloon City, Hong Kong, China	Southern China (Guizhou to Guangxi, eastern Guangdong, and Hong Kong).	Protonym Lanius jocosus
P. j. hainanensis (Hachisuka, 1939)		Northern Vietnam, southern China (Hainan, Naozhou Island).	
P. j. pattani Deignan, 1948	Khao Yai National Park, Thailand	Thailand to northern Malaya and southern Indochina.	

== Description ==
The red-whiskered bulbul is about 20 cm (7.9 in) in length. It has brown upper-parts and whitish underparts with buff flanks and a dark spur running onto the breast at shoulder level. It has a tall pointed black crest, red face patch and thin black moustachial line. The tail is long and brown with white terminal feather tips, but the vent area is red. Juveniles lack the red patch behind the eye, and the vent area is rufous-orange.

An albino red-whiskered bulbul has also been recorded.

The red-whiskered bulbul's loud and evocative call is a sharp kink-a-joo, also transcribed as pettigrew or kick-pettigrew or pleased to meet you. Its song is a scolding chatter, more often heard than seen; it but often perches conspicuously especially in the mornings when it calls from the tops of trees.

== Distribution and habitat ==
This is a bird of lightly wooded areas, more open country with bushes and shrubs, and farmland. Irruptions have been noted from early times with Thomas C. Jerdon noting that they were "periodically visiting Madras and other wooded towns in large flocks".

It has established itself in Australia and in Los Angeles, Hawaii, and Florida in the United States, as well as in Mauritius, on Assumption Island and Mascarene Islands. In Florida, it is only found in a small area, and its population could be extirpated easily. It was eradicated from Assumption Island in 2013–2015 to prevent colonisation of nearby Aldabra, the largest introduced bird-free tropical island.

The red-whiskered bulbul was introduced by the Zoological and Acclimatization Society in 1880 to Sydney, became well established across the suburbs by 1920, and continued to spread slowly to around 100 km away. It is now also found in suburban Melbourne and Adelaide, although it is unclear how they got there.

== Behaviour and ecology ==
=== Breeding ===
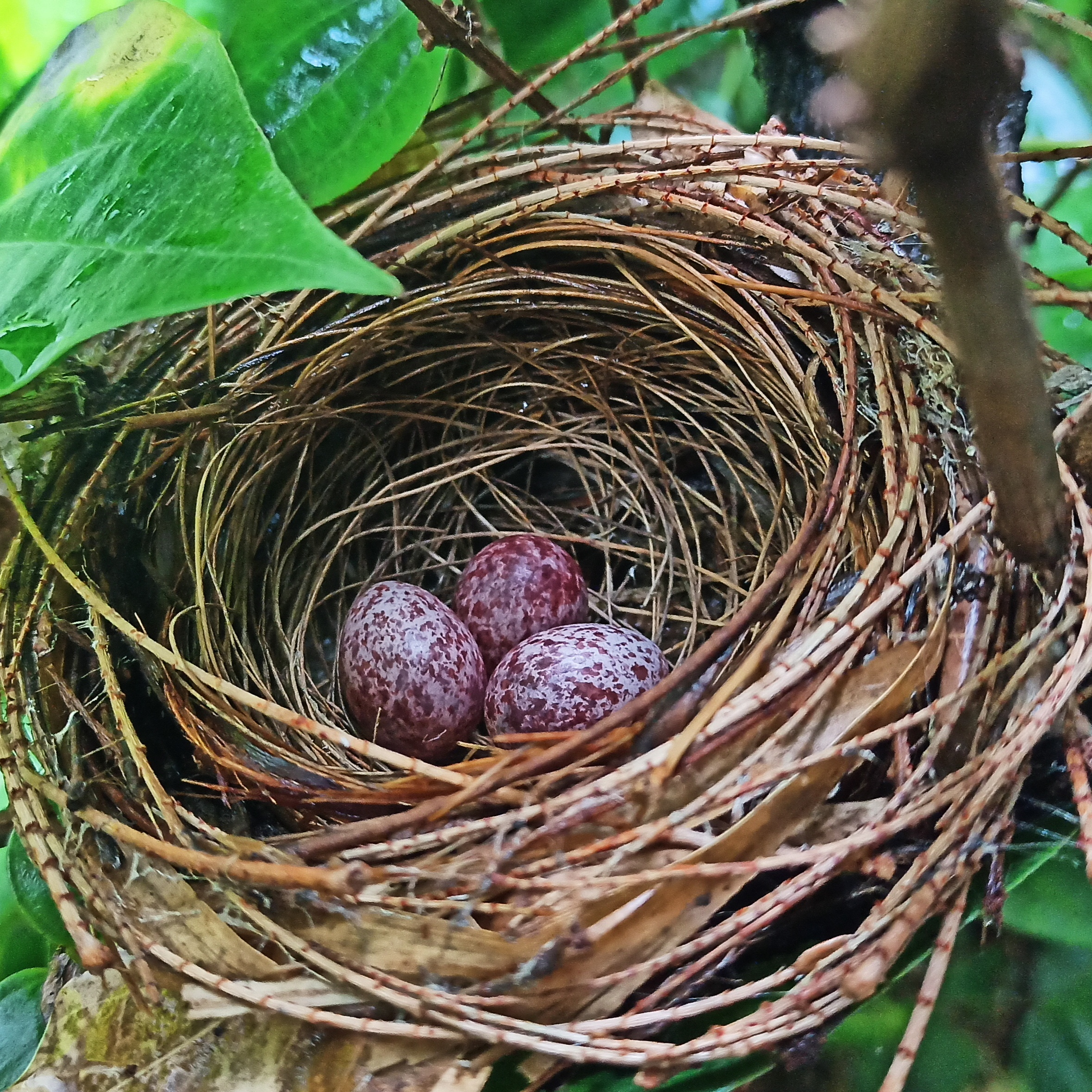
Eggs in the nest of a red-whiskered bulbul

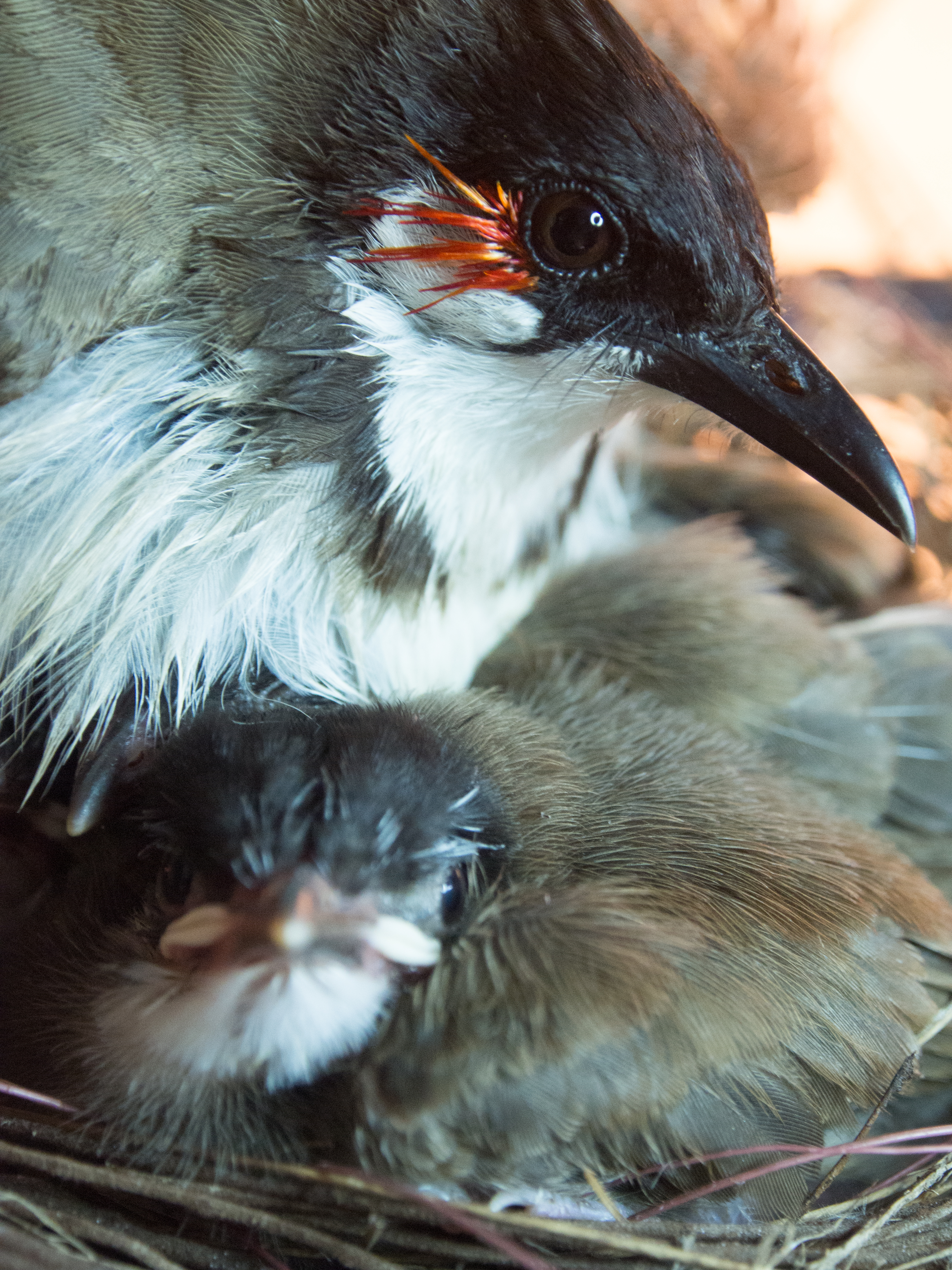
With chicks in nest

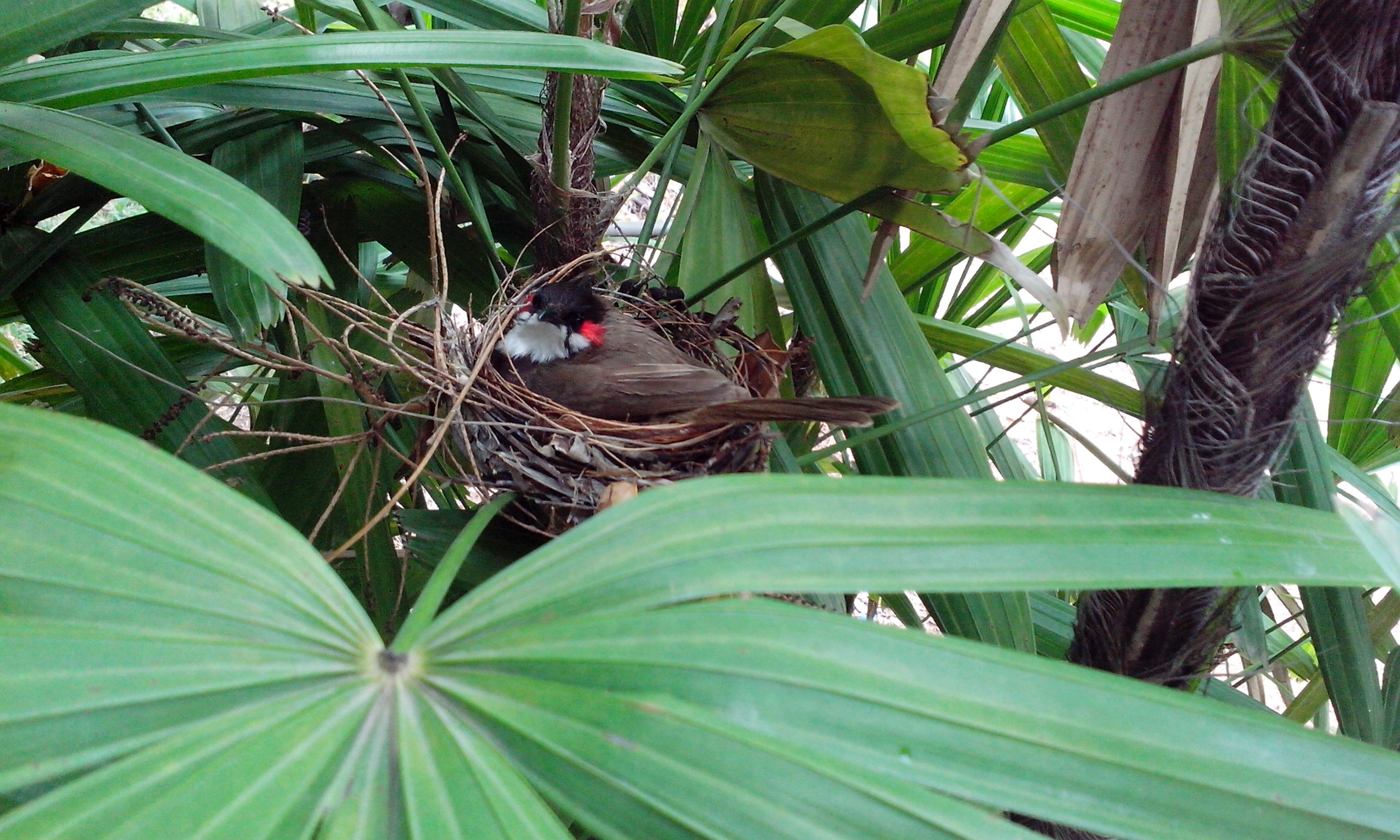
Red-whiskered bulbul at nest

The red-whiskered bulbul's breeding season is spread out and peaks from December to May in southern India and March to October in northern India. Breeding occurs once or twice a year. The courtship display of the male involves head bowing, spreading the tail and drooping wings. The nest is cup-shaped, and is built on bushes, thatched walls or small trees. It is woven of fine twigs, roots, and grasses, and embellished with large objects such as bark strips, paper, or plastic bags. Clutches contain two or three eggs. Adults feign injury to distract potential predators away from the nest. The eggs have a pale mauve ground colour with speckles becoming blotches towards the broad end. Eggs measure 21 mm (0.83 in) and are 16 mm (0.63 in) wide. Eggs take 12 days to hatch, and both parents take part in raising the young, feeding them on caterpillars and insects which are replaced by fruits and berries as they mature. The chicks have downs only in the pterylae. Eggs and chicks are preyed on by the greater coucal and crows.

The red-whiskered bulbul defends territories of about 3,000 m^{2} (32,000 sq ft) during the breeding season. It roosts communally in loose groups of a hundred or more birds. Its life span is about 11 years in captivity.

=== Food and feeding ===
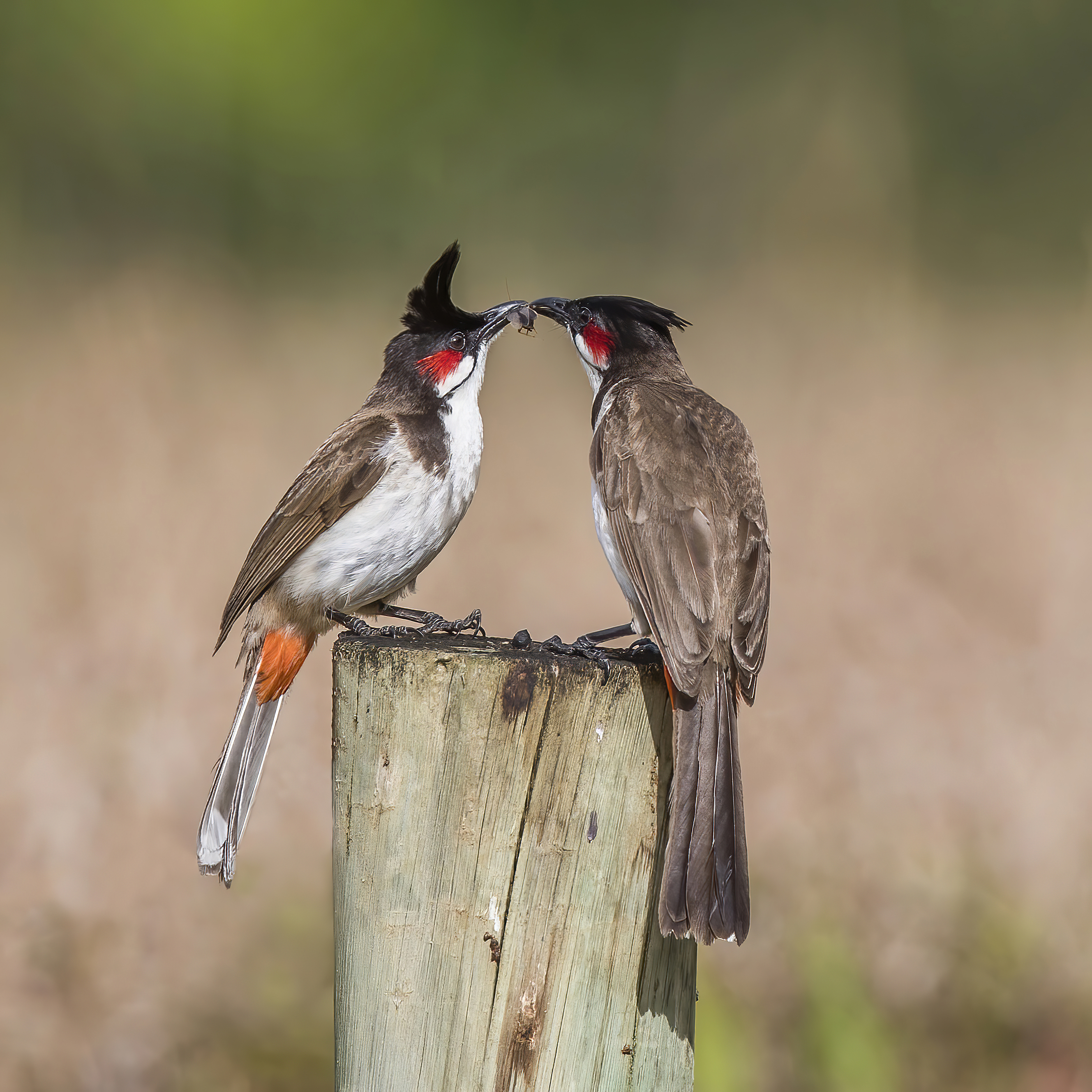
Exchanging food, in Mauritius

The red-whiskered bulbul feeds on insects, nectar and fruits, including those of the yellow oleander. In Florida, it feeds on fruits and berries of as many as 24 exotic plants including loquat (Eriobotrya japonica), Lantana spp., Brazilian pepper (Schinus terebinthifolius) and figs (Ficus). In Mauritius, it aids the dispersal of Ligustrum robustum and Clidemia hirta. Seeds that pass through its gut germinate better.

The red-whiskered bulbul population on the island of Réunion established itself and also aided the spread of alien plant species such as Rubus alceifolius. It has diversified in the course of thirty years and shows variations in bill morphology according to the food resources that it has adapted to utilize.

=== Health ===
The red-whiskered bulbul is known to host several avian malaria parasites. One is Plasmodium jiangi that was discovered in 1993 in southeast China.

== Threats ==
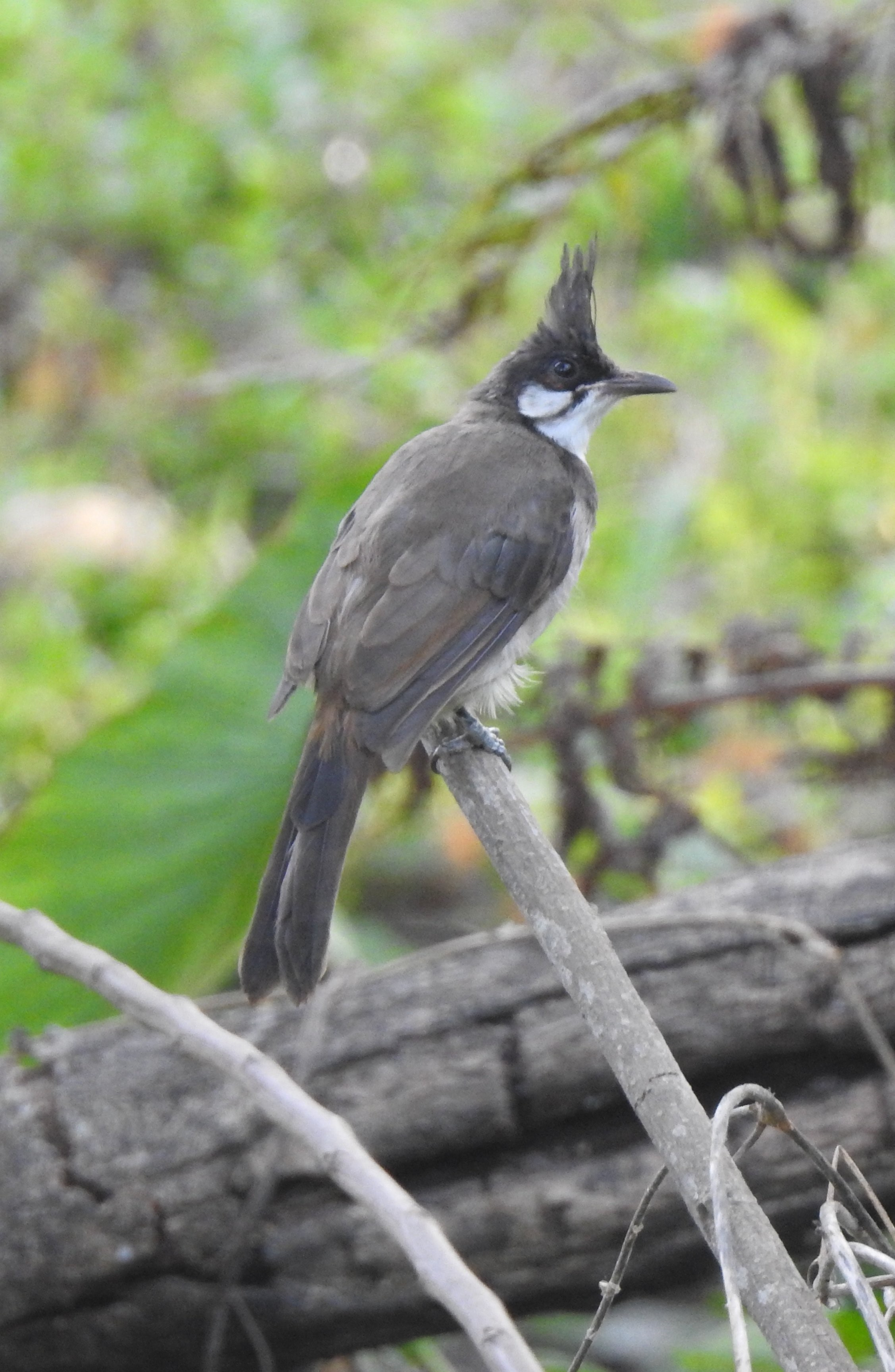
Red-whiskered bulbul immature missing red patch

The red-whiskered bulbul was once a popular cage bird in parts of India. It is still a popular cagebird in parts of Southeast Asia.

== In culture ==
Captive hybrids have been bred with the red-vented, white-eared, white-spectacled, black-capped and Himalayan bulbuls.

== Other sources ==
- Fraser, F.C. (1930). "Note on the nesting habits of the Southern Red-whiskered Bulbul (Otocompsa emeria fuscicaudata)". J. Bombay Nat. Hist. Soc. 34 (1): 250–252.
- Michael, Bindhu; Amrithraj, M.; Pillai, K. Madhavan (1997). "A note on Isospora infection in a Southern Redwhiskered Bulbul (Pycnonotus jocosus fuscicaudatus)". Zoos' Print Journal. 12 (12): 5.
- Kinloch, A. P. (1922). "Nidification of the Southern Redwhiskered Bulbul Otocompsa emeria fuscicaudata". Journal of the Bombay Natural History Society. 28 (2): 545.
