= Digitalose =

Names
- IUPAC name 6-Deoxy-3-O-methyl-D-galactose
- Other names D-Digitalose; 6-Deoxy-3-O-methylgalactose; 3-Methyl-D-fucose

Identifiers
| CAS Number | 4481-08-7 |
| 3D model (JSmol) | Interactive image |
| ChEBI | CHEBI:10368 |
| ChemSpider | 167312 |
| KEGG | C08235 |
| PubChem CID | 192798 |
| UNII | 6U8DD4P360 |
| CompTox Dashboard (EPA) | DTXSID401305613 |
- InChI: InChI=1S/C7H14O5/c1-4(9)6(11)7(12-2)5(10)3-8/h3-7,9-11H,1-2H3/t4-,5+,6+,7-/m1/s1 Key: MPQBLCRFUYGBHE-JRTVQGFMSA-N; InChI=1/C7H14O5/c1-4(9)6(11)7(12-2)5(10)3-8/h3-7,9-11H,1-2H3/t4-,5+,6+,7-/m1/s1 Key: MPQBLCRFUYGBHE-JRTVQGFMBY
- SMILES: O=C[C@H](O)[C@@H](OC)[C@@H](O)[C@H](O)C

Properties
| Chemical formula | C_{7}H_{14}O_{5} |
| Molar mass | 178.184 g·mol^{−1} |
| Melting point | 106 °C (223 °F; 379 K) |
- Except where otherwise noted, data are given for materials in their standard state (at 25 °C [77 °F], 100 kPa). Infobox references

Digitalose is a deoxy sugar that is a component of various cardiac glycosides including thevetin and emicymarin. It was first reported in 1892 as being obtained by the hydrolysis of Digtalinum verum. The chemical structure was first elucidated in 1943 by the German chemist Otto Schmidt. Chemically, it is a methyl ether of D-fucose.

== See also ==
- Sarmentose, a related deoxy sugar
