= Glycoproteinosis =

- Specialty: Endocrinology

Glycoproteinosis are lysosomal storage diseases affecting glycoproteins, resulting from defects in lysosomal function. The term is sometimes reserved for conditions involving degradation of glycoproteins.

== Types ==
- (E77.0) Defects in post-translational modification of lysosomal enzymes
  - Mucolipidosis II (I-cell disease)
  - Mucolipidosis III (pseudo-Hurler polydystrophy)
- (E77.1) Defects in glycoprotein degradation
  - Aspartylglucosaminuria
  - Fucosidosis
  - Mannosidosis
  - Sialidosis (mucolipidosis I)

Another type, recently characterized, is galactosialidosis.
