= Peruvoside =

Chemical compound

Clinical data
- Other names: (3S,5R,10R,13R,14S,17R)- 3-[(2S,5R)- 3,5-dihydroxy- 4-methoxy- 6-methyloxan- 2-yl]oxy- 14-hydroxy- 13-methyl- 17-(5-oxo-2H-furan-3-yl)- 1,2,3,4,5,6,7,8,9,11,12,15,16,17- tetradecahydrocyclopenta[a]phenanthrene- 10-carbaldehyde
- ATC code: C01AX02 (WHO)

Identifiers
- IUPAC name: (3β,5β,8ξ,9ξ)- 3-[(6-deoxy- 3-O-methyl- α-D- glycero- hexopyranosyl)oxy]- 14-hydroxy- 19-oxocard- 20(22)enolide
- CAS Number: 1182-87-2
- PubChem CID: 14449
- ChemSpider: 16498835
- UNII: CT36KGC6A6
- ChEMBL: ChEMBL1075790
- CompTox Dashboard (EPA): DTXSID70881388
- ECHA InfoCard: 100.013.327

Chemical and physical data
- Formula: C_{30}H_{44}O_{9}
- Molar mass: 548.673 g·mol^{−1}
- 3D model (JSmol): Interactive image
- SMILES: O=C\1OC/C(=C/1)[C@H]6CC[C@@]5(O)[C@]6(C)CC[C@H]3[C@H]5CC[C@@H]4C[C@@H](O[C@@H]2O[C@@H](C)[C@H](O)[C@@H](OC)[C@@H]2O)CC[C@]34C=O
- InChI: InChI=1S/C30H44O9/c1-16-24(33)26(36-3)25(34)27(38-16)39-19-6-10-29(15-31)18(13-19)4-5-22-21(29)7-9-28(2)20(8-11-30(22,28)35)17-12-23(32)37-14-17/h12,15-16,18-22,24-27,33-35H,4-11,13-14H2,1-3H3/t16-,18+,19-,20+,21-,22+,24-,25-,26+,27-,28+,29+,30-/m0/s1; Key:PMTSPAGBAFCORP-HBUONDEYSA-N

Peruvoside (or cannogenin thevetoside) is a cardiac glycoside for heart failure.

It is derived from Cascabela thevetia (Thevetia neriifolia).
