= Mucolipidosis =

Inherited metabolic disorder

- Other names: ML
- Mucolipidosis has an autosomal recessive pattern of inheritance
- Specialty: Endocrinology

Mucolipidosis is a group of inherited metabolic disorders that affect the body's ability to carry out the normal turnover of various materials within cells.

When originally named, the mucolipidoses derived their name from the similarity in presentation to both mucopolysaccharidoses and sphingolipidoses. A biochemical understanding of these conditions has changed how they are classified. Four conditions (types I, II, III, and IV) were historically labeled as mucolipidoses. However, type I (sialidosis) is now classified as a glycoproteinosis, and type IV (Mucolipidosis type IV) is now classified as a gangliosidosis.

== ML II and III ==
The other two types are closely related.

Mucolipidosis types II and III (ML II and ML III) result from a deficiency of the enzyme N-acetylglucosamine-1-phosphotransferase, which phosphorylates target carbohydrate residues on N-linked glycoproteins. Without this phosphorylation, the glycoproteins are not destined for lysosomes, and they escape outside the cell.

== Genetics ==
The mucolipidoses are inherited in an autosomal recessive manner, that is, they occur only when a child inherits two copies of the defective gene, one from each parent. When both parents carry a defective gene, each of their children faces a one in four chance of developing one of the MLs. At the same time, each child also faces a one in two chance of inheriting only one copy of the defective gene. People who have only one defective gene are known as carriers. These individuals do not develop the disease but they can pass the defective gene on to their children. Because the defective genes involved in certain forms of ML are known, tests can identify people who are carriers in some instances.

== Diagnosis ==
The diagnosis of ML is based on clinical symptoms, a complete medical history, and certain laboratory tests. Symptoms of the disease are usually present at birth or begin in early childhood. Early symptoms can include skeletal abnormalities, vision problems, and developmental delays. Poor mental capacities and difficulty reaching physical developmental milestones may also be the result of mucolipidosis.

== Treatment ==
There is currently no known treatment or specific therapy to cure this disease. However, multiple therapies can be used to help with some of the symptoms. Speech therapy and physical therapy may aid in a diagnosed child's motor and speech delays. Nutritional supplements such as iron and vitamin B12 may also be required if the patient needs them.

== See also ==
- Medical genetics of Ashkenazi Jews
