= FUCA2 =

Protein-coding gene in the species Homo sapiens

Identifiers
- Aliases: FUCA2, dJ20N2.5, fucosidase, alpha-L- 2, plasma, alpha-L-fucosidase 2
- External IDs: OMIM: 136820; MGI: 1914098; GeneCards: FUCA2
Enzyme activity
EC #	BRENDA	ExPASy	KEGG	MetaCyc
3.2.1.51	↗	↗	↗	↗

Gene location (Human)
Chr.	Chromosome 6 (human)
Band	6q24.2	Start	143,494,812 bp
Band	6q24.2	End	143,511,720 bp

Gene location (Mouse)
Chr.	Chromosome 10 (mouse)
Band	10|10 A2	Start	13,375,284 bp
Band	10|10 A2	End	13,394,779 bp
RNA expression pattern
Bgee	Human / Mouse (ortholog); Top expressed in: decidua; islet of Langerhans; stromal cell of endometrium; mucosa of ileum; rectum; monocyte; tendon of biceps brachii; left adrenal gland; left adrenal cortex; right adrenal gland / Top expressed in: interventricular septum; epithelium of small intestine; right kidney; proximal tubule; human kidney; ileum; seminal vesicula; transitional epithelium of urinary bladder; myocardium of ventricle; cardiac muscles; More reference expression data
BioGPS	n/a
Gene ontology
Molecular function	hydrolase activity; alpha-L-fucosidase activity; hydrolase activity, acting on glycosyl bonds; protein binding
Cellular component	extracellular exosome; extracellular region; extracellular space; azurophil granule lumen; endoplasmic reticulum lumen; lysosome
Biological process	fucose metabolic process; metabolism; glycoside catabolic process; neutrophil degranulation; post-translational protein modification; carbohydrate metabolic process
Sources:Amigo / QuickGO
Orthologs
Databases	NCBI: entry; OMA: entry
Species	Human	Mouse
Entrez	2519	66848
Ensembl	ENSG00000001036	ENSMUSG00000019810
UniProt	Q9BTY2; Q7Z6V2	Q99KR8
RefSeq (mRNA)	NM_032020	NM_025799; NM_001330198
RefSeq (protein)	NP_114409	NP_001317127; NP_080075
Location (UCSC)	Chr 6: 143.49 – 143.51 Mb	Chr 10: 13.38 – 13.39 Mb
PubMed search
- Wikidata
View/Edit Human	View/Edit Mouse

Plasma alpha-L-fucosidase (see alpha-L-fucosidase) is an enzyme that in humans is encoded by the FUCA2 gene.

== See also ==
- Tissue alpha-L-fucosidase, encoded by FUCA1 gene
