= 1,3-alpha-L-fucosidase =

Class of enzymes

1,3-α-L-Fucosidase

Identifiers
- EC no.: 3.2.1.111
- CAS no.: 83061-50-1

Databases
- IntEnz: IntEnz view
- BRENDA: BRENDA entry
- ExPASy: NiceZyme view
- KEGG: KEGG entry
- MetaCyc: metabolic pathway
- PRIAM: profile
- PDB structures: RCSB PDB PDBe PDBsum
Search
- PMC: articles
- PubMed: articles
- NCBI: proteins

The enzyme 1,3-α-L-fucosidase (EC 3.2.1.111) catalyzes the hydrolytic cleavage of the 1,3-linkages between α-L-fucose and N-acetylglucosamine residues in glycoproteins.

It belongs to the family of hydrolases, specifically those glycosidases that hydrolyse O- and S-glycosyl compounds. The systematic name of this enzyme class is 3-α-L-fucosyl-N-acetylglucosaminyl-glycoprotein fucohydrolase. This enzyme is also called almond emulsin fucosidase I. It participates in the degradation of glycan structures.
