= 1,2-α-L-fucosidase =

Class of enzymes

1,2-α-L-Fucosidase

Identifiers
- EC no.: 3.2.1.63
- CAS no.: 37288-45-2

Databases
- BRENDA: enzyme data
- ExPASy: NiceZyme view
- KEGG: enzyme entry
- MetaCyc: metabolic pathway
- Rhea: reactions
- PDB structures: RCSB PDB PDBe PDBsum
- Gene Ontology: AmiGO / QuickGO
Search
- PMC: articles
- PubMed: articles
- NCBI: proteins

The enzyme 1,2-α-L-fucosidase (EC 3.2.1.63) catalyzes the following chemical reaction:

(1)
H_{2}O
L-fucose
+
methyl β-D-galactoside

The enzyme characterised from Aspergillus niger, Chamelea gallina, and almonds hydrolyses methyl-2-α-L-fucopyranosyl-β-D-galactoside (1) to L-fucose and methyl β-D-galactoside. The mechanism of the reaction has been studied by X-ray crystallography of isolates from Bifidobacterium bifidum which are structurally similar to bacterial phosphorylases and shown to involve inversion at the anomeric centre. It has been suggested that the enzyme from that source be added to pig food in commercial production to reduce methane emissions by promoting beneficial gut bacteria and reduce methanogens.

It is a hydrolase, specifically a glycosidase that hydrolyses O- and S-glycosyl compounds. The systematic name is 2-α-L-fucopyranosyl-β-D-galactoside fucohydrolase. Other names in use include almond emulsin fucosidase, and α-(1→2)-L-fucosidase.

== Structural studies ==
As of late 2007, 4 structures have been solved for this class of enzymes, with PDB accession codes PDB: 2EAB, PDB: 2EAC, PDB: 2EAD, and PDB: 2EAE.
