= Rainbow baby =

Child born after previous miscarriage

A rainbow baby is a child born to a family that has previously lost one or more children due to stillbirth, miscarriage, ectopic pregnancy, termination for medical reasons, or death during infancy. The term "rainbow" is symbolic of the hope brought by the child after the emotional storm of the previous loss.

Research conducted at the University of Michigan establishes that "parental relationships have a higher risk of dissolving after a miscarriage or stillbirth, compared with a live birth", and that the risk is highest for those couples who have experienced a stillbirth.

In the 21st century, such parents seeking to have another child often turn to online support groups for information and encouragement.

According to physician Jennifer Kulp-Makarov, "It is an extremely emotional and devastating experience to lose a pregnancy or baby. To create a life or bring a baby into the world after such a loss is amazing like a miracle for these parents."

Those interested in supporting such families have designated August 22 each year as "National Rainbow Baby Day". Some professional photographers volunteer to take free photos of these babies. In some cases, these are group photographs.

== Different viewpoints on the term ==
Although the term rainbow baby is widely used in the pregnancy loss community, some women feel discomfort with the term, each for their own reasons. They might feel the term focuses on the baby's death rather than their real life or they might think that there is no need to put a label that gives this child a special identity or title in relation to their other siblings.

== See also ==
- Savior sibling
