= Fucosidosis =

- Other names: Alpha-L-fucosidase deficiency
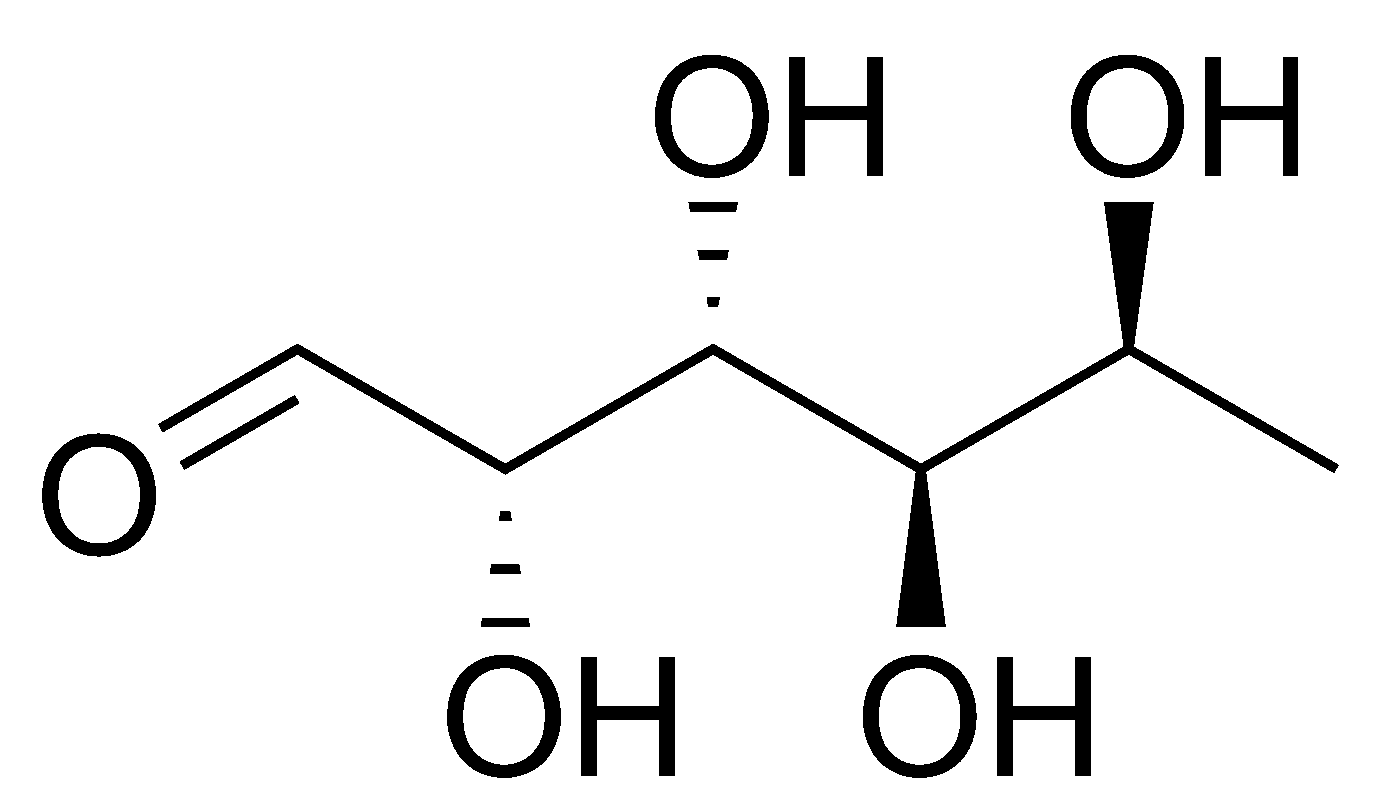
- Fucose
- Specialty: Endocrinology
- Frequency: 0.0001%

Fucosidosis is a rare lysosomal storage disorder in which the FUCA1 gene experiences mutations that severely reduce or stop the activity of the alpha-L-fucosidase enzyme. The result is a buildup of complex sugars in parts of the body, which leads to death. Fucosidosis is one of nine identified glycoprotein storage diseases. The gene encoding the alpha-fucosidase, FUCA 1, was found to be located to the short arm of chromosome 1p36 - p34, by Carrit and co-workers, in 1982.

== Symptoms and signs ==
Symptoms are highly variable, with mild cases being able to live to within the third or fourth decade.

Symptoms include:

- Coarse facial features
- Enlarged liver, spleen, and/or heart
- Intellectual disability
- Seizures
- Abnormal bone formation of many bones
- Progressive deterioration of brain and spinal cord
- Increased or decreased perspiration

Severe cases can develop life-threatening complications early in childhood. In the more severe forms (type 1), "patients have no vascular lesions, but have rapid psychomotor regression, severe and rapidly progressing neurologic signs, elevated sodium and chloride excretion in the sweat, and fatal outcome before the sixth year."

More severe forms are linked with intellectual disability.

== Cause ==
Fucosidosis is an autosomal recessive disorder that affects many areas of the body. Mutations in the FUCA1 gene cause fucosidosis. The FUCA1 gene provides instructions for making an enzyme called alpha-L-fucosidase. The enzyme plays a role in the breakdown of complex sugars in the body. The deficiency of the enzyme alpha-L-fucosidase, which is used to metabolize complex compounds in the body (fucose-containing glycolipids and fucose-containing glycoproteins), leads to lysosomal accumulation of a variety of glycoproteins, glycolipids, and oligosaccharides that contain fucose moieties. The result is incomplete breakdown of glycolipids and glycoproteins. These partially broken down compounds accumulate in various parts of the body and begin to cause malfunction in cells, and can eventually cause cell death. Brain cells are especially sensitive to this buildup. Other results are progressive neurological deterioration, skin abnormalities, growth retardation, skeletal disease, and coarsening of facial features. Fucosidosis is the consequence of faulty degradation of both sphingolipids and polysaccharides. Major accumulation of the H-antigen (a member of the ABO blood group antigens), a glycolipid, is seen primarily in the liver of fucosidosis patients; some researchers have speculated that blood type may play a role in the course of the disease.

== Diagnosis ==
A special urine test is available to check for any partially broken-down sugars. If they are present, a skin or blood sample will be taken to test for below-normal amounts of alpha-fucosidase.

Fucosidosis is an autosomal recessive disorder, which means that both parents have to have the mutation and pass it on to the child. When both parents have the mutation, there is a 25% chance of each child having fucosidosis.

The condition was traditionally separated by type, with type 1 beginning sooner, progressing more quickly, and being more severe, and type 2 being milder and progressing more slowly; a third, even milder form has also been recognized. Fucosidosis is now considered to be a single disorder and "represents a disease spectrum with a wide variety of expression." More severe forms (type 1) appear in the first 3 to 18 months of life, while milder forms typically appear between 12 and 24 months.

== Treatment ==
There is no treatment or way to reverse the disease; treatment instead focuses on the individual's symptoms, such as seizure medication.

Research into bone marrow transplants, in an attempt to improve enzyme activity, is ongoing as of 2023.

== History ==
Fucosidosis is an extremely rare disorder first described in 1962 in two Italian siblings who showed progressive intellectual disability and neurological deterioration. The disease itself is extremely rare (less than 100 documented cases) only affecting 1:2,000,000, with most cases occurring in Italy, Cuba, and the southwest U.S.

== Other forms ==
Canine fucosidosis is found in the English Springer Spaniel.

Typically affecting dogs between 18 months and four years, symptoms include:

- Loss of learned behavior
- Change in temperament
- Blindness
- Loss of balance
- Deafness
- Weight loss

From the onset, disease progress is quick and fatal.

As in the human version, canine fucosidosis is a recessive disorder and two copies of the gene must be present, one from each parent, in order to show symptoms of the disease.

== See also ==
- Sialidosis
