= 1,6-alpha-L-fucosidase =

Class of enzymes

1,6-α-L-Fucosidase

Identifiers
- EC no.: 3.2.1.127
- CAS no.: 102925-35-9

Databases
- IntEnz: IntEnz view
- BRENDA: BRENDA entry
- ExPASy: NiceZyme view
- KEGG: KEGG entry
- MetaCyc: metabolic pathway
- PRIAM: profile
- PDB structures: RCSB PDB PDBe PDBsum
Search
- PMC: articles
- PubMed: articles
- NCBI: proteins

The enzyme 1,6-α-L-fucosidase (EC 3.2.1.127) catalyses the following chemical reaction

Hydrolysis of 1,6-linkages between α-L-fucose and N-acetyl-D-glucosamine in glycopeptides such as immunoglobulin G glycopeptide and fucosyl-asialo-agalacto-fetuin

It belongs to the family of hydrolases, specifically those glycosidases that hydrolyse O- and S-glycosyl compounds. The systematic name is 1,6-L-fucosyl-N-acetyl-D-glucosaminylglycopeptide fucohydrolase. It is also called α-L-fucosidase.
