= Fucose =

L-Fucose
- Haworth projection of Beta-L-fucopyranose

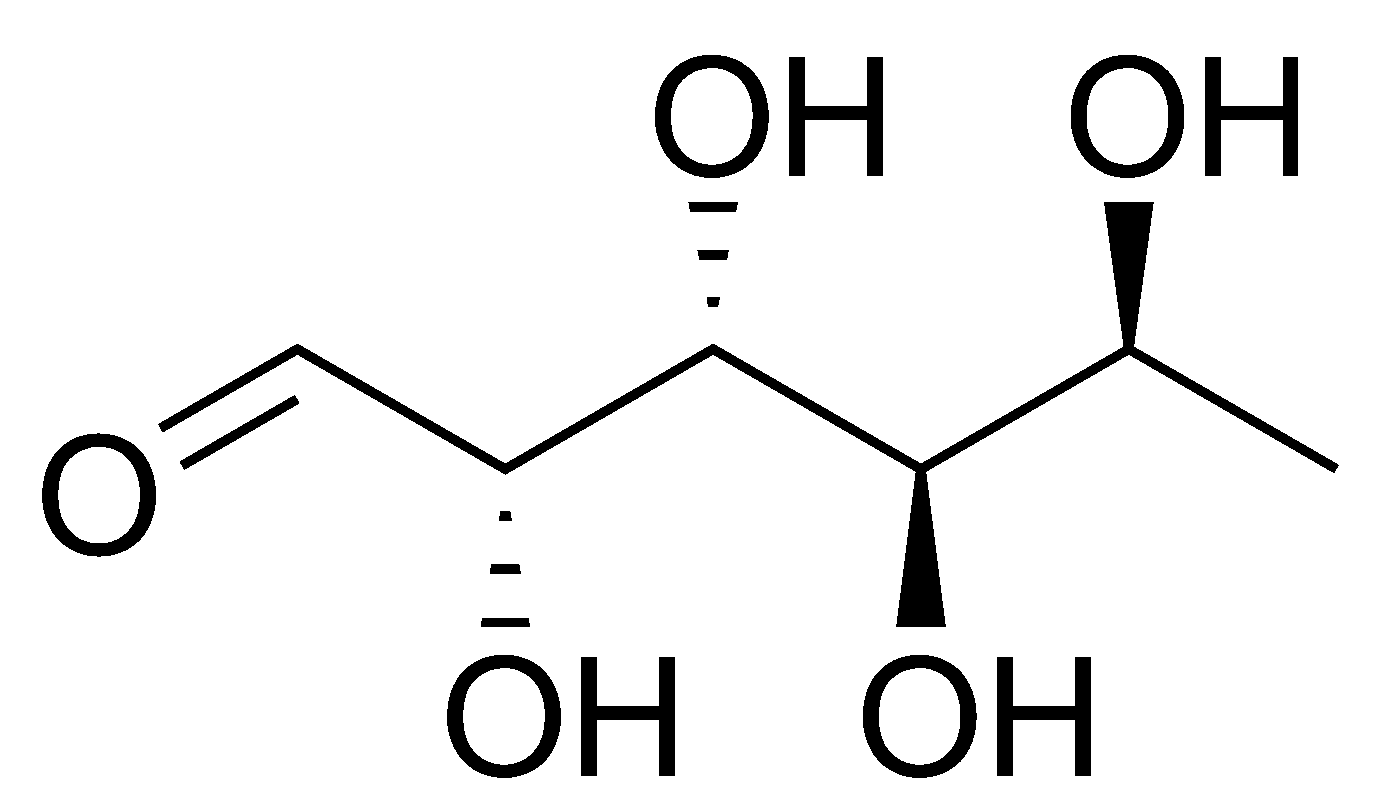

Names
- IUPAC name 6-Deoxy-L-galactopyranose
- Systematic IUPAC name (2S,3R,4R,5S)-6-Methyltetrahydro-2H-pyran-2,3,4,5-tetraol
- Other names 6-Deoxy-L-galactose

Identifiers
CAS Number	2438-80-4
3D model (JSmol)	Interactive image
ChEBI	CHEBI:2181
ChEMBL	ChEMBL469449
ChemSpider	16190
PubChem CID	17106
UNII	28RYY2IV3F
- InChI: InChI=1S/C6H12O5/c1-2-3(7)4(8)5(9)6(10)11-2/h2-10H,1H3/t2-,3+,4+,5-,6?/m0/s1 Key: SHZGCJCMOBCMKK-DHVFOXMCSA-N; InChI=1/C6H12O5/c1-2-3(7)4(8)5(9)6(10)11-2/h2-10H,1H3/t2-,3+,4+,5-,6?/m0/s1 Key: SHZGCJCMOBCMKK-DHVFOXMCBB
- SMILES: O[C@@H]1[C@H](O)[C@@H](OC(O)[C@H]1O)C

Properties
Chemical formula	C_{6}H_{12}O_{5}
Molar mass	164.157 g·mol^{−1}

Supplementary data page
- Fucose (data page)
- Except where otherwise noted, data are given for materials in their standard state (at 25 °C [77 °F], 100 kPa). verify (what is ?) Infobox references

Fucose is a hexose deoxy sugar with the chemical formula C_{6}H_{12}O_{5}. It is found on N-linked glycans on the mammalian, insect and plant cell surface. Fucose is the fundamental sub-unit of the seaweed polysaccharide fucoidan. The α(1→3) linked core of fucoidan is a suspected carbohydrate antigen for IgE-mediated allergy.

Two structural features distinguish fucose from other six-carbon sugars present in mammals: the lack of a hydroxyl group on the carbon at the 6-position (C-6) (thereby making it a deoxy sugar) and the L-configuration. It is equivalent to 6-deoxy-L-galactose.

In the fucose-containing glycan structures, fucosylated glycans, fucose can exist as a terminal modification or serve as an attachment point for adding other sugars. In human N-linked glycans, fucose is most commonly linked α-1,6 to the reducing terminal β-N-acetylglucosamine. However, fucose at the non-reducing termini linked α-1,2 to galactose forms the H antigen, the substructure of the A and B blood group antigens.

Fucose is released from fucose-containing polymers by an enzyme called α-fucosidase found in lysosomes.

L-Fucose has several potential applications in cosmetics, pharmaceuticals, and dietary supplements.

Fucosylation of antibodies has been established to reduce binding to the Fc receptor of Natural Killer cells and thereby reduce antibody-dependent cellular cytotoxicity. Therefore, afucosylated monoclonal antibodies have been designed to recruit the immune system to cancers cells have been manufactured in cell lines deficient in the enzyme for core fucosylation (FUT8), thereby enhancing the in vivo cell killing.

The word fucose comes from Latin fucus, meaning "seaweed," and the conventional suffix -ose for carbohydrates and, in particular, sugars.

== See also ==
- Digitalose, the methyl ether of D-fucose
- Fucitol
- Fucosidase
- Fucosyltransferase
- Verotoxin-producing Escherichia coli
