= Alpha-L-fucosyltransferase =

alpha-L-fucosyltransferase may refer to

- Glycoprotein 6-alpha-L-fucosyltransferase
- Galactoside 2-alpha-L-fucosyltransferase
- FUT2
- FUT1
- Glycoprotein 3-alpha-L-fucosyltransferase
- 3-galactosyl-N-acetylglucosaminide 4-alpha-L-fucosyltransferase
- Fucosyltransferase 3
- 4-galactosyl-N-acetylglucosaminide 3-alpha-L-fucosyltransferase
- Peptide-O-fucosyltransferase
- Fucosyltransferase
- FUT5
- FUT8
- FUT9
- FUT6
- FUT7
- Fucosyltransferase 4
