= Sialyl-Lewis X =

Names
- IUPAC name (5-Acetamido-3,5-dideoxy-D-glycero-α-D-galacto-non-2-ulopyranosylonic acid)-(2→3)-β-D-galactopyranosyl-(1→4)-[α-L-fucopyranosyl-(1→3)]-N-acetyl-D-glucosamine
- Systematic IUPAC name (2S,4S,5R,6R)-5-Acetamido-2-{[(2S,3R,4S,5S,6R)-2-{[(2R,3R,4R,5R)-5-acetamido-1,2-dihydroxy-6-oxo-3-{[(2S,3S,4R,5S,6S)-3,4,5-trihydroxy-6-methyloxan-2-yl]oxy}hexan-3-yl]oxy}-2,4-dihydroxy-6-(hydroxymethyl)oxan-4-yl]oxy}-4-hydroxy-6-[(1R,2R)-1,2,3-trihydroxypropyl]oxane-2-carboxylic acid
- Other names sialyl Le^{X}, SLe^{X}, CD15s, SSEA-1

Identifiers
CAS Number	98603-84-0
3D model (JSmol)	Interactive image
ChEMBL	ChEMBL375586
ChemSpider	559072
MeSH	sialyl+Lewis+X
PubChem CID	643990
UNII	0PS35WG8U3
CompTox Dashboard (EPA)	DTXSID60913167
- InChI: InChI=1S/C31H52N2O23/c1-9-18(43)21(46)22(47)28(51-9)53-24(12(5-34)32-10(2)38)25(15(42)7-36)54-29-23(48)27(20(45)16(8-37)52-29)56-31(30(49)50)4-13(40)17(33-11(3)39)26(55-31)19(44)14(41)6-35/h5,9,12-29,35-37,40-48H,4,6-8H2,1-3H3,(H,32,38)(H,33,39)(H,49,50)/t9-,12-,13-,14+,15+,16+,17+,18+,19+,20-,21+,22-,23+,24+,25+,26+,27-,28-,29-,31-/m0/s1 Key: LAQPKDLYOBZWBT-NYLDSJSYSA-N; InChI=1/C31H52N2O23/c1-9-18(43)21(46)22(47)28(51-9)53-24(12(5-34)32-10(2)38)25(15(42)7-36)54-29-23(48)27(20(45)16(8-37)52-29)56-31(30(49)50)4-13(40)17(33-11(3)39)26(55-31)19(44)14(41)6-35/h5,9,12-29,35-37,40-48H,4,6-8H2,1-3H3,(H,32,38)(H,33,39)(H,49,50)/t9-,12-,13-,14+,15+,16+,17+,18+,19+,20-,21+,22-,23+,24+,25+,26+,27-,28-,29-,31-/m0/s1 Key: LAQPKDLYOBZWBT-NYLDSJSYBC
- SMILES: O=C(N[C@@H]1[C@@H](O)C[C@](O[C@H]1[C@H](O)[C@H](O)CO)(O[C@@H]2[C@@H](O)[C@@H](O[C@H](CO)[C@@H]2O)O[C@@H]([C@H](O[C@@H]3O[C@H]([C@@H](O)[C@@H](O)[C@@H]3O)C)[C@H](C=O)NC(=O)C)[C@H](O)CO)C(=O)O)C

Properties
Chemical formula	C_{31}H_{52}N_{2}O_{23}
Molar mass	820.744 g/mol
- Except where otherwise noted, data are given for materials in their standard state (at 25 °C [77 °F], 100 kPa). verify (what is ?) Infobox references

Sialyl Lewis^{X} (sLeX), also known as cluster of differentiation 15s (CD15s) or stage-specific embryonic antigen 1 (SSEA-1), is a tetrasaccharide carbohydrate which is usually attached to O-glycans on the surface of cells. It is known to play a vital role in cell-to-cell recognition processes. It is also the means by which an egg attracts sperm; first, to stick to it, then bond with it and eventually form a zygote.

Sialyl-Lewis^{X} is also one of the most important blood group antigens and is displayed on the terminus of glycolipids that are present on the cell surface. The sialyl-Lewis^{X} determinant, E-selectin ligand carbohydrate structure, is constitutively expressed on granulocytes and monocytes and mediates inflammatory extravasation of these cells. Resting T and B lymphocytes lack its expression and are induced to strongly express sialyl-Lewis^{X} upon activation. The sialyl-Lewis^{X} determinant is expressed preferentially on activated T_{h}1 cells but not on T_{h}2 cells.

== Structure ==
Sialyl-Lewis^{X} is a tetrasaccharide composed of a sialic acid, fucose and an N-acetyllactosamine. Its systematic name is 5-acetylneuraminyl-(2-3)-galactosyl-(1-4)-(fucopyranosyl-(1-3))-N-acetylglucosamine (Neu5Acα2-3Galβ1-4[Fucα1-3]GlcNAcβ). In humans, it is synthesized by four fucosyltransferases: FUT3, FUT5, FUT6 and FUT7. The other three enzymes of the sialyltransferase family, ST3GAL3, ST3GAL4, and ST3GAL6, participate in the synthesis of the sialyl-Lewis^{X} precursor.

== Function ==
=== Leukocyte homing ===
Sialyl-Lewis^{X} is important in leukocyte tethering and rolling. Leukocytes move through the blood stream and then tether themselves to the endothelial wall and roll along the endothelium before potentially exiting into the tissue. Sialyl-Lewis^{X} is a necessary partner for the three selectins that bind the leukocyte and endothelial cells. When sialyl-Lewis^{X} is part of an O-glycan and attached to CD34, it can then bind to L-selectin. For the binding to L-selectin to occur, sialyl-Lewis^{X} must undergo sulfation. For sialyl-Lewis^{X} to bind to P-selectin, an O-linked glycan near the N-terminus of P-selectin glycoprotein ligand-1 (PSGL-1) is modified with sialyl-Lewis^{X} and, in combination with nearby tyrosine residues modified with sulfate, forms the binding contact for P-selectin. For sialyl-Lewis^{X} to bind to E-selectin, it can be part of either an N-linked or O-linked glycan attached to cell surface glycoproteins such as PSGL-1, CD43 or CD44. This sialyl-Lewis^{X}-mediated binding to selectins allows circulating leukocytes to stick to and roll along endothelial cells lining blood vessels, thereby enabling the leukocytes to accumulate at a site of vascular inflammation.

=== Fertilization ===
Sialyl-Lewis^{X} allows a sperm cell to recognize and fertilize an egg cell. For fertilization to occur, human sperm must bind to the zona pellucida (ZP), the translucent matrix covering the human egg composed of four glycoproteins—ZP1, 2, 3, and 4—and transit through the matrix in order to fuse with the oocyte. The human ZP is coated with dense N- and O-glycans that are terminated with the sialyl-Lewis^{X} sequence. The hemizona assay, which assesses sperm–ZP binding by counting the number of sperm bound to hemispheres of bisected nonliving human eggs in vitro, reveals that 0.5 mM sialyl-Lewis^{X} inhibits sperm–ZP binding by 63%. Furthermore, adding purified and solubilized ZP3 or ZP4 from the human oocyte dose-dependently inhibits sperm–ZP binding in the hemizona assay. Such evidence suggest that the early steps of human sperm–egg binding may be mediated by lectins for sialyl-Lewis^{X} present on human sperm.

== Clinical significance ==
=== Leukocyte adhesion deficiency ===
Defective synthesis of the sialyl-Lewis^{X} antigen results in immunodeficiency (leukocyte adhesion deficiency type 2). Defective synthesis can be caused by the loss of fucosyltransferase, impairing the glycosylation of the glycosphingolipid. Sialyl-Lewis^{X} is being researched for detection and treatment of immune disorders because of its presence on leukocytes.

=== Blood cancers ===
Sialyl-Lewis^{X} mediates phagocytosis and chemotaxis, found in neutrophils; it is expressed by cells present in Hodgkin disease, some B-cell chronic lymphocytic leukemias, acute lymphoblastic leukemias, and most acute nonlymphocytic leukemias. CD15 is present on almost all Reed–Sternberg cells, including their rare mononuclear variants, and, as such, can be used in immunohistochemistry to identify the presence of such cells in biopsies. The presence of these cells is diagnostic of Hodgkin's lymphoma. Reed–Sternberg cells display a characteristic pattern of sialyl-Lewis^{X} positivity, with membranous staining combined with staining of the Golgi apparatus. Immunohistochemical panels for the diagnosis of Hodgkin's disease typically employ CD15 along with CD30 and CD45; the latter does not stain Reed–Sternberg cells, but does stain almost all other lymphoid cells. Sialyl-Lewis^{X} is also present in about 50% of adenocarcinoma cells and can be used to distinguish such conditions from mesothelioma, which is typically negative.

=== Cancer metastasis ===
Sialyl-Lewis^{X} plays a critical role in cancer metastasis, facilitating the extravasation of cancer cells out of the bloodstream when they are moving through the body. Its expression is related to tumor stage, recurrence, and overall patient survival. Therefore, sialyl Lewis x is being used as a target in studies to fight tumors and cancer cell growth. There is frequent overexpression of sialyl-Lewis^{X} on cancer cells, and it is found on both N-glycan and O-glycans. Sialyl-Lewis^{X} is being researched with CD markers to find new ways to create biosensors for cancer cells. It is also being used in new ways to target cancer cells specifically for cancer treatment.

=== In vitro fertilization ===
Sialyl-Lewis^{X} is being used to achieve greater rates of fertilization of eggs in women by coating the eggs with sialyl-Lewis^{X}.

=== Immunity and inflammation ===
Sialyl-Lewis^{X} plays a key role in the inflammatory response and may be used to increase the leukocyte response to infections. Sialyl-Lewis^{X} is also an inflammation-associated antigen on liver cells. It is overexpressed on diseased liver cells and can be used as a way to detect liver disease in a patient.

=== MERS coronavirus binding ===
In June 2019, before the onset of the COVID-19 pandemic, the receptor for sulfated sialyl-Lewis^{X} oligosaccharide (particularly with α2,3 linkages) was found to be the preferred binding site, both in humans and in dromedary camels, for the coronavirus causing Middle East respiratory syndrome (MERS), the sixth coronavirus to be described.

== History ==
The term "Lewis" in the name comes from a family of people with a red blood cell incompatibility. The studies done on these individuals' red blood cells led to the discovery of sialyl-Lewis^{X}. Sialyl-Lewis^{X} is an important red blood cell antigen present on the glycolipids on the plasma membrane of the cell.

Its localization to the cell surface of cells led to its alternative nomenclature as a cluster of differentiation. Clusters of differentiation are a naming system devised in 1982 to classify cell-surface antigens on leukocytes identified via monoclonal antibodies. Sialyl-Lewis^{X} was assigned the name CD15.

== See also ==
- CA19-9 (sialyl-Lewis^{A})
- Lewis antigen
