= C31H52N2O23 =

The molecular formula C_{31}H_{52}N_{2}O_{23} (molar mass: 820.74 g/mol) may refer to:

- Sialyl-Lewis^{A}
- Sialyl-Lewis^{X}
