= Fucosyltransferase =

Class of enzymes

Glycosyltransferase family 10 (fucosyltransferase)

Identifiers
- Symbol: Glyco_transf_10
- Pfam: PF00852
- InterPro: IPR001503
Available protein structures:
- PDB: IPR001503 PF00852 (ECOD; PDBsum)
- AlphaFold: IPR001503; PF00852

A fucosyltransferase is an enzyme that transfers an L-fucose sugar from a GDP-β-L-fucose (guanosine diphosphate-fucose) donor substrate in α-linkage to an acceptor substrate. The acceptor substrate can be another sugar such as the transfer of a fucose to a core GlcNAc (N-acetylglucosamine) sugar as in the case of N-linked glycosylation, or to a protein, as in the case of O-linked glycosylation produced by O-fucosyltransferase. There are various fucosyltransferases in mammals, the vast majority of which, are located in the Golgi apparatus. The O-fucosyltransferases all localize to the endoplasmic reticulum (ER).

Some of the proteins in this group are responsible for the molecular basis of the blood group antigens, surface markers on the outside of the red blood cell membrane. Most of these markers are proteins, but some are carbohydrates attached to lipids or proteins. Galactoside 3(4)-L-fucosyltransferase (EC 2.4.1.65) belongs to the Lewis blood group system and is associated with Le(a/b) antigen.

== Classification ==
Glycosyltransferase family 10 comprises enzymes with five known activities; galactoside 3(4)-L-fucosyltransferase (EC 2.4.1.65), galactoside 3-fucosyltransferase (EC 2.4.1.152), peptide O-fucosyltransferase (EC 2.4.1.221), glycoprotein 3-α-L-fucosyltransferase (EC 2.4.1.214) and the recently defined EMI-domain-modifying peptide O-fucosyltransferases (mammalian FUT10 and FUT11, renamed POFUT3 and POFUT4). The galactoside 3-fucosyltransferases display similarities with the alpha-2 and alpha-6-fucosyltranferases. The biosynthesis of the carbohydrate antigen sialyl-Lewis X (sLe(x)) is dependent on the activity of an galactoside 3-fucosyltransferase. This enzyme catalyses the transfer of fucose from GDP-beta-fucose to the 3-OH of N-acetylglucosamine present in lactosamine acceptors.

While the aforementioned POFUT3 and POFUT4 enzymes are included in glycosyltransferase family 10, POFUT1 is the sole member of family 65 while POFUT2 is the sole member of family 68 .

FUT8 is the sole enzyme in mammals adding core α1,6-fucose to N-linked glycans (EC 2.4.1.68). It is classified as a glycosyltransferase family 23 member .

Fucosyltransferases in non-mammals, e.g., plants and nematodes follow a different numbering scheme.

== Role in preventing UTIs ==
Robust fucosyltransferase activity discourages bacterial adherence in the urethra of women. This is also mediated by the presence of few bacterial adhesion sites in the bladder and urethra. Women with these receptors who do not have mucosal secretion of the fucosyltransferase enzyme to help block bacterial adherence are more likely to have colonization of E. coli and other coliforms from the rectum and less likely to have lactobacilli in the periurethral area, resulting in frequent episodes of cystitis.

== Human proteins containing this domain ==
FUT1; FUT2; FUT3; FUT4; FUT5; FUT6; FUT7; FUT8; FUT9; FUT10; FUT11;

== See also ==
- Fucosylation
