= Fucose-1-phosphate guanylyltransferase =

Class of enzymes

Identifiers
- EC no.: 2.7.7.30
- CAS no.: 9033-14-1

Databases
- BRENDA: enzyme data
- ExPASy: NiceZyme view
- KEGG: enzyme entry
- MetaCyc: metabolic pathway
- Rhea: reactions
- PDB structures: RCSB PDB PDBe PDBsum
- Gene Ontology: AmiGO / QuickGO
Search
- PMC: articles
- PubMed: articles
- NCBI: proteins

Fucose-1-phosphate guanylyltransferase (EC 2.7.7.30) is an enzyme that catalyzes the chemical reaction

guanosine triphosphate
+
β-L-fucose 1-phosphate
PP_{i}
GDP-L-fucose

The enzyme characterised from pig liver combines guanosine triphosphate and β-L-fucose 1-phosphate to give GDP-L-fucose, with pyrophosphate (PP_{i}) as a byproduct. The sugar starting material is biosynthesised by fucokinase and the product is used by all fucosyltransferases. This is a salvage pathway for L-fucose.

This enzyme is a transferase, specifically one transferring phosphorus-containing nucleotide groups (nucleotidyltransferases). The systematic name of this enzyme class is GTP:beta-L-fucose-1-phosphate guanylyltransferase. Other names in common use include GDP fucose pyrophosphorylase, guanosine diphosphate L-fucose pyrophosphorylase, GDP-L-fucose pyrophosphorylase, GDP-fucose pyrophosphorylase, and GTP:L-fucose-1-phosphate guanylyltransferase.
