= FPGT =

Protein-coding gene in humans

Identifiers
- Aliases: FPGT, GFPP, fucose-1-phosphate guanylyltransferase
- External IDs: OMIM: 603609; MGI: 1922790; GeneCards: FPGT
Enzyme activity
EC #	BRENDA	ExPASy	KEGG	MetaCyc
2.7.7.30	↗	↗	↗	↗

Gene location (Human)
Chr.	Chromosome 1 (human)
Band	1p31.1	Start	74,198,238 bp
Band	1p31.1	End	74,234,086 bp

Gene location (Mouse)
Chr.	Chromosome 3 (mouse)
Band	3|3 H4	Start	154,790,555 bp
Band	3|3 H4	End	154,799,040 bp
RNA expression pattern
Bgee	Human / Mouse (ortholog); Top expressed in: monocyte; gonad; Achilles tendon; gallbladder; secondary oocyte; testicle; rectum; islet of Langerhans; jejunal mucosa; ventricular zone / Top expressed in: zygote; secondary oocyte; interventricular septum; primary oocyte; olfactory epithelium; islet of Langerhans; epithelium of small intestine; Epithelium of choroid plexus; otolith organ; Region I of hippocampus proper; More reference expression data
BioGPS	n/a
Gene ontology
Molecular function	transferase activity; nucleotide binding; transferase activity, transferring phosphorus-containing groups; nucleotidyltransferase activity; GTP binding; catalytic activity; fucose-1-phosphate guanylyltransferase activity
Cellular component	cytoplasm; cytosol
Biological process	fucose metabolic process
Sources:Amigo / QuickGO
Orthologs
Databases	NCBI: entry; OMA: entry
Species	Human	Mouse
Entrez	8790	75540
Ensembl	ENSG00000254685	ENSMUSG00000053870
UniProt	O14772	G5E8F4
RefSeq (mRNA)	NM_003838; NM_001199328; NM_001199329	NM_029330
RefSeq (protein)	NP_001186257; NP_001186258; NP_003829	NP_083606
Location (UCSC)	Chr 1: 74.2 – 74.23 Mb	Chr 3: 154.79 – 154.8 Mb
PubMed search
- Wikidata
View/Edit Human	View/Edit Mouse

Fucose-1-phosphate guanylyltransferase is an enzyme that in humans is encoded by the FPGT gene.

L-fucose is a key sugar in glycoproteins and other complex carbohydrates since it may be involved in many of the functional roles of these macromolecules, such as in cell–cell recognition. The fucosyl donor for these fucosylated oligosaccharides is GDP-beta-L-fucose.

There are two alternate pathways for the biosynthesis of GDP-fucose; the major pathway converts GDP-alpha-D-mannose to GDP-beta-L-fucose. The protein encoded by this gene participates in an alternate pathway that is present in certain mammalian tissues, such as liver and kidney, and appears to function as a salvage pathway to reutilize L-fucose arising from the turnover of glycoproteins and glycolipids.

This pathway involves the phosphorylation of L-fucose to form beta-L-fucose-1-phosphate, and then condensation of the beta-L-fucose-1-phosphate with GTP by fucose-1-phosphate guanylyltransferase to form GDP-beta-L-fucose.
