= Trehalose 6-phosphate phosphorylase =

Class of enzymes

Identifiers
- EC no.: 2.4.1.216

Databases
- IntEnz: IntEnz view
- BRENDA: BRENDA entry
- ExPASy: NiceZyme view
- KEGG: KEGG entry
- MetaCyc: metabolic pathway
- PRIAM: profile
- PDB structures: RCSB PDB PDBe PDBsum
- Gene Ontology: AmiGO / QuickGO
Search
- PMC: articles
- PubMed: articles
- NCBI: proteins

Trehalose 6-phosphate phosphorylase (EC 2.4.1.216) is an enzyme that catalyzes the chemical reaction

trehalose 6-phosphate
P_{i}
glucose 6-phosphate
+
glucose 1-phosphate

The two substrates of this enzyme characterised from Lactococcus lactis are alpha,alpha'-trehalose 6-phosphate and orthophosphate (P_{i}). Its products are glucose 6-phosphate and glucose 1-phosphate.

This enzyme belongs to the family of glycosyltransferases, specifically the hexosyltransferases. The systematic name of this enzyme class is alpha,alpha-trehalose 6-phosphate:phosphate beta-D-glucosyltransferase. This enzyme is also called trehalose 6-phosphate:phosphate beta-D-glucosyltransferase.
