= Mannotetraose 2-alpha-N-acetylglucosaminyltransferase =

Class of enzymes

mannotetraose 2-alpha-N-acetylglucosaminyltransferase

Identifiers
- EC no.: 2.4.1.138
- CAS no.: 81032-47-5

Databases
- IntEnz: IntEnz view
- BRENDA: BRENDA entry
- ExPASy: NiceZyme view
- KEGG: KEGG entry
- MetaCyc: metabolic pathway
- PRIAM: profile
- PDB structures: RCSB PDB PDBe PDBsum
- Gene Ontology: AmiGO / QuickGO
Search
- PMC: articles
- PubMed: articles
- NCBI: proteins

In enzymology, a mannotetraose 2-alpha-N-acetylglucosaminyltransferase (EC 2.4.1.138) is an enzyme that catalyzes the chemical reaction

UDP-N-acetyl-D-glucosamine + 1,3-alpha-D-mannosyl-1,2-alpha-D-mannosyl-1,2-alpha-D-mannosyl-D-mannose $\rightleftharpoons$ UDP + 1,3-alpha-D-mannosyl-1,2-(N-acetyl-alpha-D-glucosaminyl-alpha-D-mannosyl)-1,2-alpha-D-mannosyl-D-mannose

The 2 substrates of this enzyme are UDP-N-acetyl-D-glucosamine and 1,3-alpha-D-mannosyl-1,2-alpha-D-mannosyl-1,2-alpha-D-mannosyl-D-mannose, whereas its 2 products are UDP and 1,3-alpha-D-mannosyl-1,2-(N-acetyl-alpha-D-glucosaminyl-alpha-D-mannosyl)-1,2-alpha-D-mannosyl-D-mannose.

This enzyme belongs to the family of glycosyltransferases, specifically the hexosyltransferases. The systematic name of this enzyme class is UDP-N-acetyl-D-glucosamine:mannotetraose alpha-N-acetyl-D-glucosaminyltransferase. Other names in common use include alpha-N-acetylglucosaminyltransferase, uridine diphosphoacetylglucosamine mannoside, and alpha1->2-alphacetylglucosaminyltransferase.
