= CA-19 =

CA-19 may refer to:

- California State Route 19, a highway in the U.S. state of California
- California's 19th congressional district, a congressional district in California
- Ca-19-9 antigen, an antigen used to screen for cancer
