= FUCT =

FUCT may refer to:

- Glycoprotein 6-alpha-L-fucosyltransferase, an enzyme
- FUCT (clothing)
- From Under the Cork Tree, an album by Fall Out Boy
