= Lewis antigen system =

Human blood group system

The Lewis antigen system is a human blood group system. It is based upon two genes on chromosome 19: FUT3, or Lewis gene; and FUT2, or Secretor gene. Both genes are expressed in glandular epithelia. FUT2 has a dominant allele which codes for an enzyme (designated Se) and a recessive allele which does not produce a functional enzyme (designated se). Similarly, FUT3 has a functional dominant allele (Le) and a non-functional recessive allele (le).

The proteins produced by the FUT2 and FUT3 genes modify type I oligosaccharide chains to create Lewis antigens. These oligosaccharide chains are similar to the type II chains of the ABO blood system, with a single bond in a different position. The link between the Lewis blood group and secretion of the ABO blood group antigens was possibly the first example of multiple effects of a human gene: the same enzyme (fucosyltransferase2) which converts the Le-a antigen to Le-b is also responsible for the presence of soluble A, B and H antigens in bodily fluids.

There are two main types of Lewis antigens, Lewis a (Le-a) and Lewis b (Le-b). There are three common phenotypes: Le(a+b-), Le(a-b+), and Le(a-b-).

The enzyme fucosyltransferase 3 (FUT3), encoded by Le gene, adds a fucose to the precursor oligosaccharide substrate, converting it to the Le-a antigen. People who have the Le allele and who are non-secretors (homozygous for the nonfunctional se allele) will express the Le-a antigen in their bodily fluids and on their erythrocytes.

If a person has both the Le and Se alleles, their exocrine cells will also have the enzyme fucosyltransferase 2 (FUT2). This adds fucose to the oligosaccharide precursor in a different position from the FUT3 enzyme. This produces the Le-b antigen. In most people having both Le and Se, it is difficult to detect the antigen Le-a. This is because the activity of the FUT2 enzyme is more efficient than the FUT3 enzyme, so the type I oligosaccharide chain is mostly converted into Le-b instead of Le-a. Therefore, people with readily detectable Lewis-a antigen are non-secretors; they do not have FUT2 activity. Lewis-b antigen is found only in secretors: people who possess the Se allele and thus have FUT2 activity. Lewis negative people (Le a-, Le b-) are homozygous for the recessive le allele and can be either secretors or non-secretors.

== Distribution of Lewis antigens ==
Lewis antigens are expressed on the surface of red blood cells, endothelium, kidney, genitourinary and gastrointestinal epithelium. Lewis antigens are red blood cell antigens which are not produced by the cell itself. Instead, Lewis antigens are components of exocrine epithelial secretions, and are subsequently adsorbed onto the surface of the red cell.

== Genetics/phenotypes ==
The three above-stated common Lewis phenotypes represent the presence or absence of Lewis and Secretor enzymes.

Le(a+b-) individuals have at least one functional Lewis gene (Le) but are homozygous for nonfunctional Secretor alleles (sese). Thus, these individuals synthesize and secrete Le(a) antigen but lack Le(b) and type 1 chain ABH. Le(a-b+) individuals inherit both Le and Se alleles, leading to the synthesis of Le(a), Le(b), and type 1 chain ABH. Most type 1 chain precursor is converted to Le(b), therefore these individuals appear as if they are Le(a-). Le(a+b+) phenotype is transiently observed in infants (Secretor activity increases with age). This phenotype is also encountered in 16% of Japanese individuals (who inherit a weak Secretor gene- Se(w)).

In absence of a functional Lewis gene (lele), neither Le(a) nor Le(b) are synthesized, leading to the Le(a-b-) phenotype. This phenotype is more common in persons of African descent.

== Clinical diagnostic ==
Clinical testing in patient care for Lewis antigens follows published minimum quality and operational requirements, similar to red cell genotyping for any of the other recognized blood group systems. Molecular analysis can identify gene variants (alleles) that may affect Lewis antigens expression on the red cell membrane.

== Lewis-related genes ==
=== Oligosaccharide precursors ===
Two precursor oligosaccharides exist, type 1 and type 2. Type 1 is found in secretions and in the serum. Type 2 is found exclusively on the surface of red blood cells. No type 1 oligosaccharide is found on RBCs. Unbranched type 1 and 2 oligosaccharides represent i antigen. Branched type 1 and 2 oligosaccharides are I antigens.

In neonates, i antigen oligosaccharides predominate (high in cord blood samples). Oligosaccharide branching increases with age, thus adults have mostly I antigen.

=== Background on ABO blood group system ===
The H gene of the ABO system encodes a fucosyltransferase that adds fucose to type 2 precursor substances on the surface of RBCs to make H antigen. The h allele is an amorphic form of the gene. If no further modifications are made to the H antigen, the person is type O. When the A gene product acts on the H antigen and adds an N-acetylgalactosamine, the A antigen results and the person is type A. When the B gene product acts on the H antigen to add a galactose, the B antigen results and the person is type B.

=== The Le gene ===
The Le gene encodes a fucosyltransferase that adds fucose to type 1 precursor substance (both free in serum and in secretions) to make the Le(a) antigen. The le gene is an amorph. The Lewis antigen produced on free type 1 precursor substance passively adsorbs onto the surfaces or red blood cells.

=== The Se gene ===
The Se gene encodes a fucosyltransferase that adds fucose to type 1 precursor generating H antigen. After this step, the Le gene product (FUT3) can add another fucose producing Le(b) antigen. Thus, individuals with the Le gene but no Se gene will have red blood cells bearing only the passively-adsorbed Le(a) but no Le(b). Individuals with both the Le gene and the Se gene will have red blood cells bearing only the passively adsorbed Le(b) and no Le(a). Individuals with no Le gene have neither Le(a) nor Le(b).

In addition, the Se gene product is responsible for the presence of A, B and H substances in secretions.

== Lewis antibodies ==
Lewis antibodies are naturally occurring antibodies, almost always IgM type, found almost exclusively in Le(a-b-) individuals. Lewis antibodies may include a mixture of anti-Le(a), anti-Le(b) and anti-Le(a+).

== Transfusion medicine practice ==
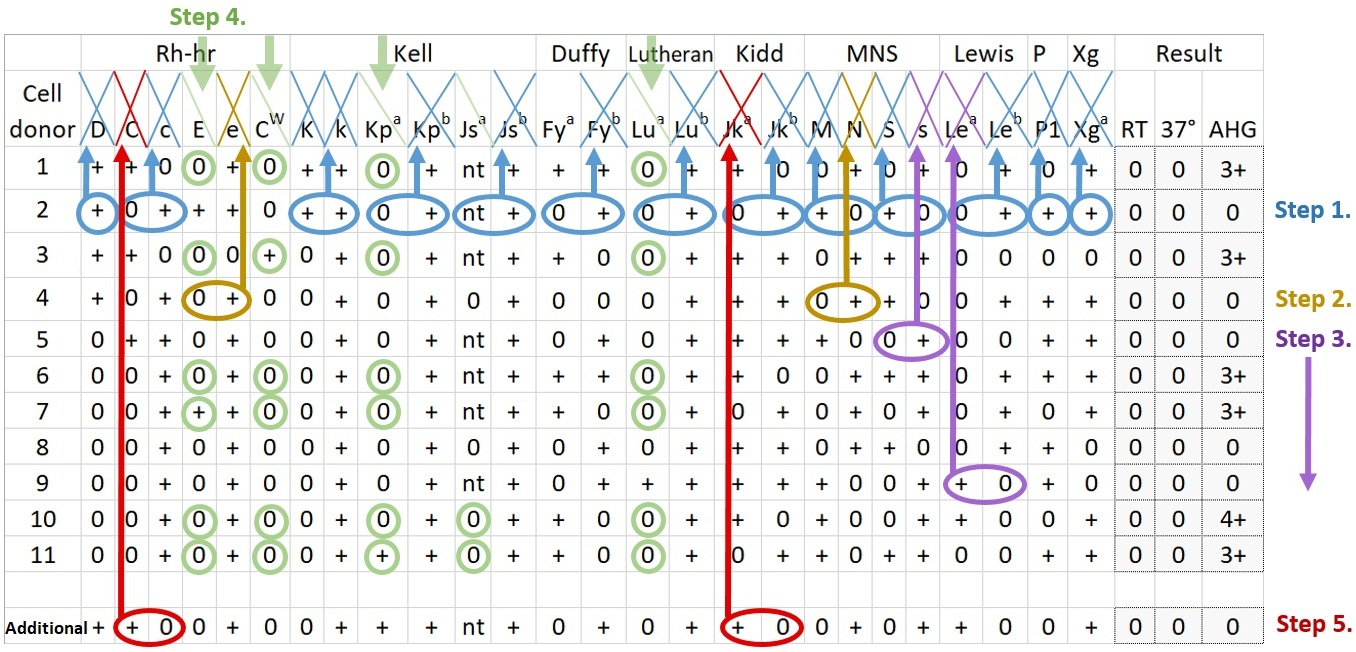
Interpretation of antibody panel to detect patient antibodies towards the most relevant human blood group systems, including Lewis.

Lewis antibodies are almost always clinically insignificant because:

- transfused red cells shed their Lewis antigens and acquire the Lewis phenotype of the recipient
- Lewis antibodies are quickly adsorbed by free serum Lewis antigens,

Therefore, it is not necessary to transfuse antigen-negative blood components for most patients.

Lewis antibodies are generally reactive at room temperature and only occasionally at 37 C and AHG phase (antihuman globulin).

Lewis antibodies are not a cause of hemolytic disease of the fetus and newborn (HDFN), as stated below.

=== Lewis antigens and antibodies neonates/pregnant women ===
Lewis antigens cannot be reliably detected until the 2nd birthday. Lewis antibodies in a pregnant woman are essentially totally insignificant because they are IgM subtype (don't cross the placenta) and Lewis antigen is weakly expressed during pregnancy (Lewis Le(a-b-) phenotype is commonly seen during gestation). Most newborns will type as Le(a-b-).

Lewis antigen is often decreased on RBCs during pregnancy with some women transiently typing as Le(a-b-). This is thought to be due in part to increased circulating plasma volume in pregnancy and increased lipoprotein.

== Disease associations ==
The Le(b) and H antigens are receptors for the bacteria Helicobacter pylori, a gram-negative bacterium that can cause gastritis and has been implicated in peptic ulcer disease, gastric adenocarcinoma, mucosa-associated lymphoma (or mucosal associated lymphatic tissue lymphoma – MALToma) and idiopathic thrombocytopenic purpura (ITP).

Le(b) and type 1 H antigens are also receptors for Norwalk virus (common cause of acute gastroenteritis).

The Le(a-b-) phenotype is associated with an increased susceptibility to infections by Candida and uropathogenic Escherichia coli.

In patients with pancreatic adenocarcinoma and not harbouring a functional Lewis enzyme (Lea-b- genotype: 7%–10% of the population), levels of CA 19-9 are typically undetectable or below 1.0 U/ml.

== See also ==
- CA 19-9 (Sialyl-Lewis^{A})
- CD15 (Sialyl-Lewis^{X})

== See also ==
- Human milk oligosaccharide, which is affected by the status of FUS2/3 genes
