= Kyowa Kirin =

Pharmaceutical company

Kyowa Kirin Co., Ltd.

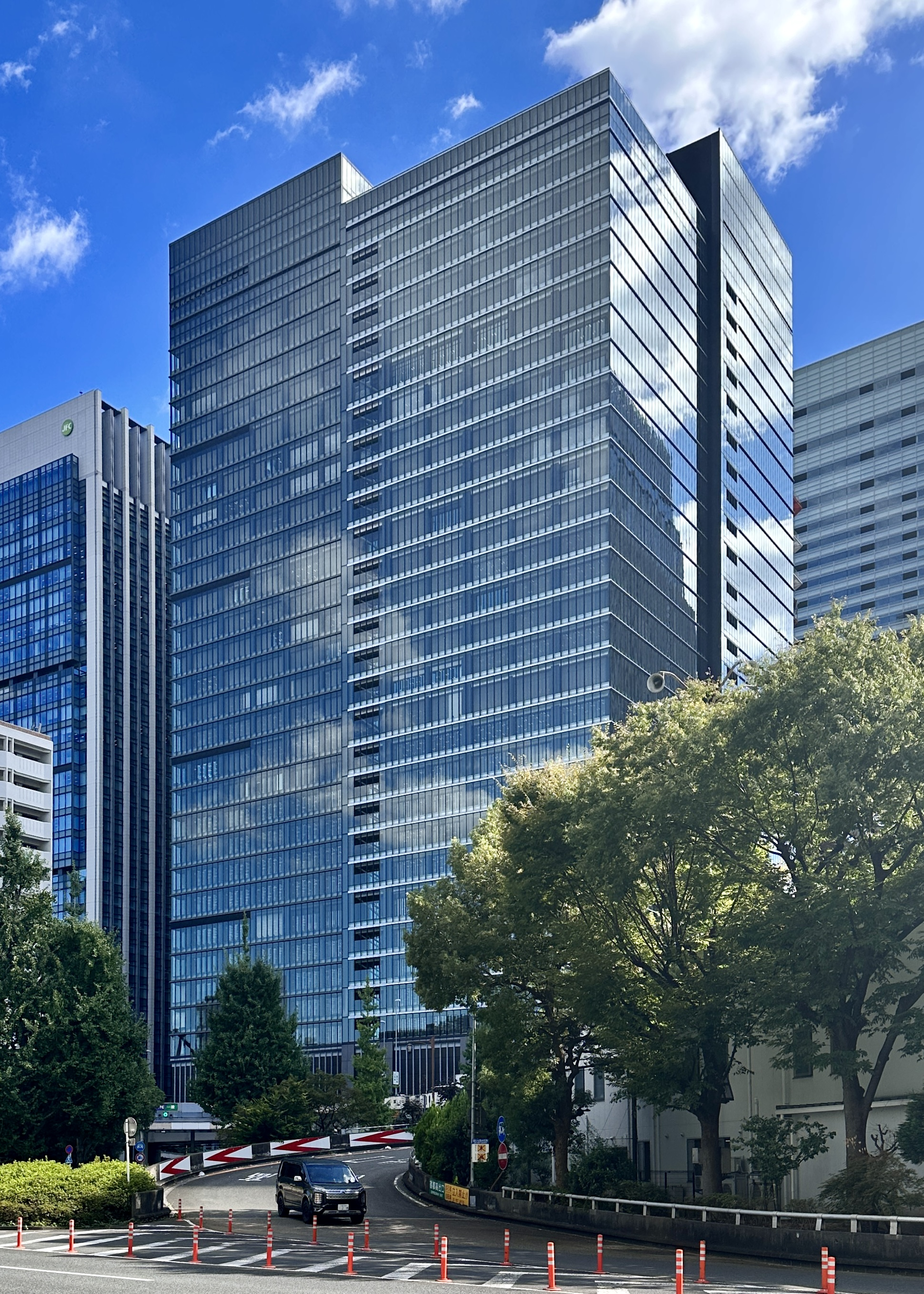
- Headquarters in Otemachi, Chiyoda, Tokyo
- Formerly: Kyowa Hakko Kogyo Co., Ltd. (1949–2008); Kyowa Hakko Kirin Co., Ltd. (2008-2019)
- Company type: Public
- Traded as: TYO: 4151; Nikkei 225 Component
- Industry: Pharmaceuticals; Biotechnology
- Predecessor: Kirin Pharma
- Founded: July 1, 1949; 76 years ago
- Headquarters: Ohtemachi Building, 1-6-1, Ōtemachi, Chiyoda, Tokyo, Japan
- Key people: Nobuo Hanai, (CEO and president)
- Products: Biochemicals; Biosimilars; Diagnostics; Pharmaceuticals
- Revenue: $ 2.99 billion USD (FY 2022) ▲ (¥ 398.4 billion JPY) (FY 2022)
- Net income: $ 375 million USD (FY 2022) ▲ (¥ 53.6 billion JPY) (FY 2022)
- Number of employees: 7,532 (consolidated) (as of December 31, 2017)
- Parent: Kirin Holdings Company, Limited
- Subsidiaries: 47 (33 in Japan and 14 overseas countries)
- Website: Official website

Kyowa Kirin Co., Ltd. (協和キリン株式会社, Kyōwa Kirin Kabushiki Kaisha) is a Japanese pharmaceutical and biotechnology company under the Kirin Holdings, and was among the 40 largest in the world by revenue in 2012. The company is headquartered in Chiyoda-ku, Tokyo and is a member of the Nikkei 225 stock index.

== History ==
The forerunner of the present-day company was called Kyowa Hakko Kogyo Co., Ltd (協和醱酵工業株式会社, lit. 'Coordinated Fermentation Industry Share Company') and was established on July 1, 1949. The company merged with Kirin Pharma Co., Ltd., on October 1, 2008 to form Kyowa Hakko Kirin (KHK) with plans to spin off the bio-chemical business into Kyowa Hakko Bio.

On July 11, 2014, the KHK subsidiary, ProStrakan Group (based in Scotland), acquired Archimedes Pharma from the Novo Nordisk Foundation for $394 million.

In 2019, Kirin Holdings acquired 95% stake in Kyowa Hakko Bio which is Kyowa Kirin's subsidiary corporation. The entity was renamed "Kyowa Kirin Co., Ltd.", replacing its prior name of Kyowa Hakko Kirin Co., Ltd.

In November 2022, Kyowa Kirin announced plans to spin its International Established Medicines portfolio, consisting of 13 brands, into a new joint venture with German company Grünenthal. The joint venture would expand Grüenthal's already extensive pain management portfolio, while Kyowa Kirin saw it as a financial benefit and an opportunity to expand the brands.

In October 2023, Kyowa Kirin acquired a Britain-based biopharmaceutical company, Orchard Therapeutics, for $478 million, aiming to expand their portfolio.

== Business segments and products ==
=== Pharmaceuticals business ===
The company developed a method to make afucosylated monoclonal antibodies using a CHO cell line in which FUT8 has been knocked out; the company calls this its "Potelligent" platform. The company gained marketing approval in Japan in April 2012 for a monoclonal antibody drug called mogamulizumab which was developed using the platform.

- Central nervous system medicines
- Immunology/Allergy medicines
- Nephrology medicines
  - ESPO / NESP / Aranesp (darbepoetin alfa)
  - REGPARA (cincalcet)
- Oncology medicines
  - ABSTRAL (fentanyl citrate)
  - GRAN / Peglasta / Neulasta (pegfilgrastim)
  - LEUNASE (asparaginase)
  - Mitomycin-C
  - SANCUSO (granisetron)
- Diagnostics
  - In vitro diagnostic reagents, analyzers and companion diagnostics

=== Bio-Chemicals business ===
- Biosimilars
- Monoclonal Antibodies
- Amino acids, nucleic acids and related compounds, health care products and other active pharmaceutical ingredients
- Vitamins, minerals, peptides and plant growth regulators
