= Galactoside 2-alpha-L-fucosyltransferase =

Class of enzymes

galactoside 2-alpha-L-fucosyltransferase

Identifiers
- EC no.: 2.4.1.69
- CAS no.: 56093-23-3

Databases
- IntEnz: IntEnz view
- BRENDA: BRENDA entry
- ExPASy: NiceZyme view
- KEGG: KEGG entry
- MetaCyc: metabolic pathway
- PRIAM: profile
- PDB structures: RCSB PDB PDBe PDBsum
- Gene Ontology: AmiGO / QuickGO
Search
- PMC: articles
- PubMed: articles
- NCBI: proteins

In enzymology, a galactoside 2-alpha-L-fucosyltransferase (EC 2.4.1.69) is an enzyme that catalyzes the chemical reaction

GDP-beta-L-fucose + beta-D-galactosyl-R $\rightleftharpoons$ GDP + alpha-L-fucosyl-1,2-beta-D-galactosyl-R

Thus, the two substrates of this enzyme are GDP-beta-L-fucose and beta-D-galactosyl-R, whereas its two products are GDP and alpha-L-fucosyl-1,2-beta-D-galactosyl-R.

This enzyme belongs to the family of glycosyltransferases, specifically the hexosyltransferases. This enzyme participates in 4 metabolic pathways: glycosphingolipid biosynthesis - lactoseries, glycosphingolipid biosynthesis - neo-lactoseries, glycosphingolipid biosynthesis - globoseries, and glycan structures - biosynthesis 2.

== Nomenclature ==
The systematic name of this enzyme class is:

- GDP-beta-L-fucose:beta-D-galactosyl-R 2-alpha-L-fucosyltransferase

Other names in common use include:

- blood group H alpha-2-fucosyltransferase
- guanosine diphosphofucose-galactoside 2-L-fucosyltransferase
- alpha-(1->2)-L-fucosyltransferase
- alpha-2-fucosyltransferase
- alpha-2-L-fucosyltransferase
- blood-group substance H-dependent fucosyltransferase
- guanosine diphosphofucose-glycoprotein 2-alpha-fucosyltransferase
- guanosine diphosphofucose-lactose fucosyltransferase
- GDP fucose-lactose fucosyltransferase
- guanosine diphospho-L-fucose-lactose fucosyltransferase
- guanosine diphosphofucose-beta-D-galactosyl-alpha-2-L-fucosyltransferase
- guanosine diphosphofucose-galactosylacetylglucosaminylgalactosylglucosylceramide
- alpha-L-fucosyltransferase, guanosine diphosphofucose-glycoprotein 2-alpha-L-fucosyltransferase
- H-gene-encoded beta-galactoside alpha1->2fucosyltransferase
- secretor-type beta-galactoside alpha1->2fucosyltransferase
- beta-galactoside alpha1->2fucosyltransferase
- GDP-L-fucose:lactose fucosyltransferase
