= Fucosylation =

Covalent attachment of a fucosyl group to an acceptor molecule

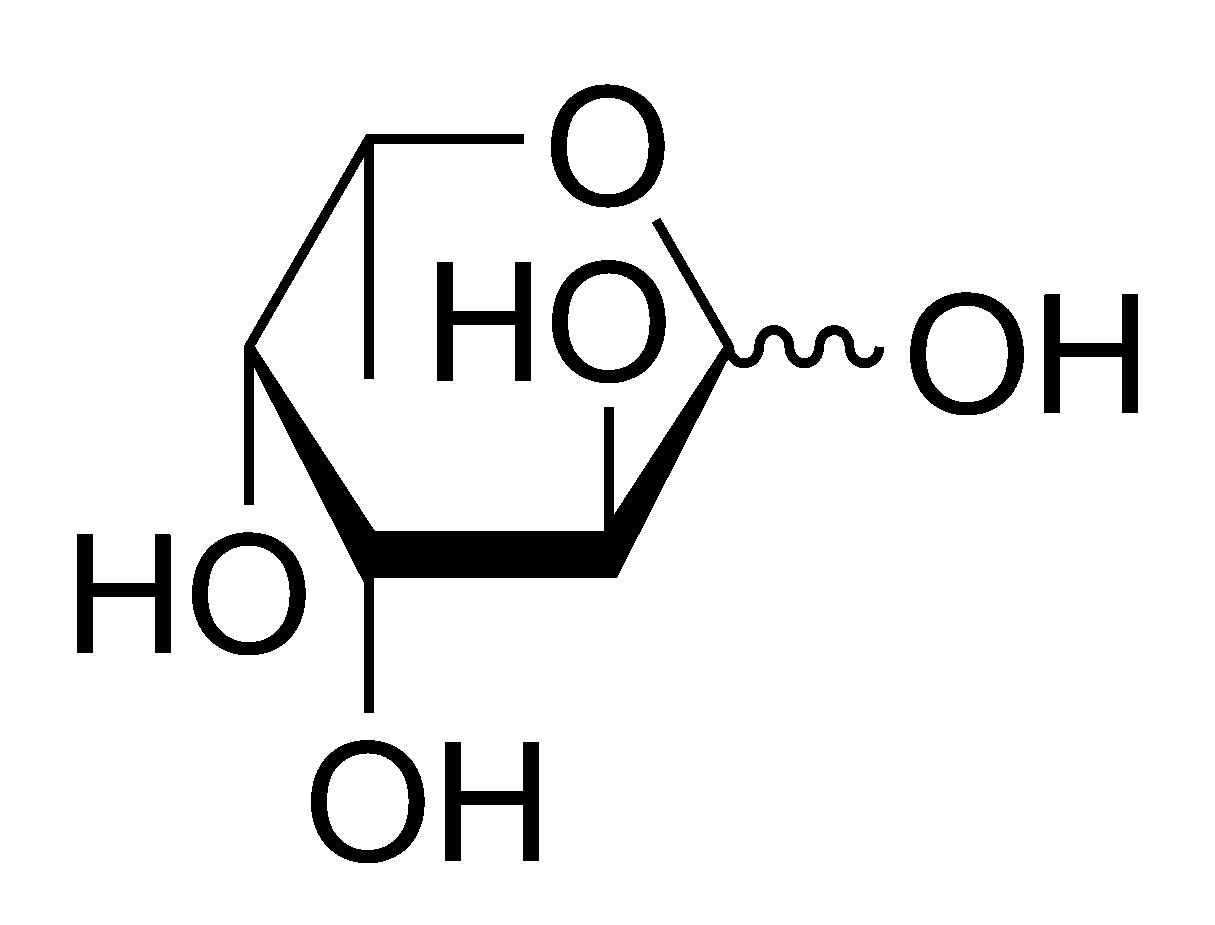
Chemical structure of Fucose

Fucosylation is the process of adding fucose sugar units to a molecule. It is a type of glycosylation.

It is important clinically, and high levels of fucosylation have been reported in cancer. In cancer and inflammation there are significant changes in the expression of fucosylated molecules. Therefore, antibodies and lectins that are able to recognize cancer associated fucosylated oligosaccharides have been used as tumor markers in oncology.

It is performed by fucosyltransferase enzymes.

Fucosylation has been observed in vertebrates, invertebrates, plants, bacteria, and fungi. It has a role in cellular adhesion and immune regulation. Fucosylation inhibition applications are being explored for a range of clinical application including some associated with sickle cell disease, rheumatoid arthritis, tumor inhibition, and chemotherapy improvements. Recent studies on melanoma patient specimens indicated that melanoma fucosylation and fucosylated HLA-DRB1 are associated with anti-programmed cell death protein 1 (PD1) responder status, pointing to the potential use of melanoma fucosylation as a method for immunotherapy patient stratification. Moreover, it has been reported that fucosylation is an important regulator of anti-tumor immunity and L-fucose can be used as a potent tool for increasing immunotherapy efficacy in melanoma.

Fucosylation can help with immune response when a foreign pathogen is introduced in the body. Rapid fucosylation can occur in the epithelial lining of the small intestine as a protective mechanism to support the body’s symbiotic gut bacteria. This may regulate the bacterial genes responsible for quorum sensing or virulence, thus resulting in an increased tolerance of the infection.
