= Fucokinase =

Identifiers
- EC no.: 2.7.1.52
- CAS no.: 37278-00-5

Databases
- IntEnz: IntEnz view
- BRENDA: BRENDA entry
- ExPASy: NiceZyme view
- KEGG: KEGG entry
- MetaCyc: metabolic pathway
- PRIAM: profile
- PDB structures: RCSB PDB PDBe PDBsum
- Gene Ontology: AmiGO / QuickGO
Search
- PMC: articles
- PubMed: articles
- NCBI: proteins

Fucokinase (EC 2.7.1.52) is an enzyme that catalyzes the chemical reaction

ATP +
β-L-fucose
ADP +
β-L-fucose 1-phosphate

The enzyme characterised from pig liver and kidney converts β-L-fucose to β-L-fucose 1-phosphate by transferring a phosphate group from the cofactor, adenosine triphosphate (ATP), which is converted to adenosine diphosphate (ADP). Fucokinase is the only enzyme that converts L-fucose to its 1-phosphate, which can be used to synthesize GDP-β-L-fucose, the donor substrate for all fucosyltransferases. L-fucokinase activity can be detected in various tissues within an animal. For instance, rats and mice contain L-fucokinase widely distributed throughout tissues especially in the brain but the levels found vary widely among different species.

This enzyme is a transferase, specifically one transferring phosphorus-containing groups (phosphotransferases) with an alcohol group as acceptor. The systematic name of this enzyme class is ATP:beta-L-fucose 1-phosphotransferase. Other names in common use include fucokinase (phosphorylating), fucose kinase, L-fucose kinase, L-fucokinase, ATP:6-deoxy-L-fucose 1-phosphotransferase, and ATP:L-fucose 1-phosphotransferase. Fucokinase is commonly abbreviated as fuc-K. The reaction is part of a salvage pathway for L-fucose.
