= Afucosylated monoclonal antibodies =

Afucosylated monoclonal antibodies are monoclonal antibodies engineered so that the oligosaccharides in the Fc region of the antibody do not have any fucose sugar units. When antibodies are afucosylated, antibody-dependent cellular cytotoxicity (ADCC) is increased.

== Background ==
Most approved monoclonal antibodies are of the IgG1 isotype, where two N-linked biantennary complex-type oligosaccharides are bound to the Fc region. The Fc region exercises the effector function of ADCC through its interaction with leukocyte receptors of the FcγR family. ADCC is important in the efficacy of cancer antibodies, but with many approved cancer antibodies there is less ADCC than could be desired due to nonspecific IgG competing with the drugs for binding to FcγIIIa on natural killer cells. Afucosylated monoclonal antibodies overcome this problem through improved FcγIIIa binding.

== Approaches ==
The Swiss company GlycArt Biotechnology developed a system using CHO cells, where the cells were engineered to overexpress an enzyme called GnTIII. The effect of this overexpression is to block the formation of fucosylated oligosaccharides on the expressed antibodies. This technology was first reported in 1999 and was the basis of GlycArt Biotechnology.

Roche acquired GlycArt in 2005 in order to acquire technology to afucosylate antibodies. GlycArt Biotechnology had been founded in 2000 as a spin-out company of the Swiss Federal Institute of Technology in Zurich. The first commercial product from the GlycArt acquisition was obinutuzumab, which as Gazyva gained FDA approval in November 2013 for the treatment of chronic lymphocytic leukemia.

Kyowa Hakko Kirin's "Potelligent" platform uses a CHO cell line in which FUT8 has been knocked out, and which produces antibodies with little to no fucose in the Fc region. The company gained marketing approval in Japan in April 2012 for a monoclonal antibody drug called mogamulizumab which was developed using the platform. The Company's technology was first reported in 2004.

== Applications of afucosylated antibodies ==
Afucosylated antibodies are intensely used in the field of advanced medicine, also due to their high ADCC (antibody-dependent cellular cytotoxicity). This makes them effective in binding to specific targets while minimizing damage to surrounding tissue.

Some of the fields in which afucosylated antibodies are used or considered for application are:

- cancer immunotherapy
- autoimmune diseases
- Infectious diseases

Furthermore, afucosylated antibodies are used as diagnostic tools and play a role in the development of personalized medications.
