= B-1,4-mannosyl-glycoprotein 4-b-N-acetylglucosaminyltransferase =

Class of enzymes

Beta-1,4-mannosyl-glycoprotein 4-beta-N-acetylglucosaminyltransferase

Identifiers
- EC no.: 2.4.1.144
- CAS no.: 83744-93-8

Databases
- IntEnz: IntEnz view
- BRENDA: BRENDA entry
- ExPASy: NiceZyme view
- KEGG: KEGG entry
- MetaCyc: metabolic pathway
- PRIAM: profile
- PDB structures: RCSB PDB PDBe PDBsum
Search
- PMC: articles
- PubMed: articles
- NCBI: proteins

Beta-1,4-mannosyl-glycoprotein 4-beta-N-acetylglucosaminyltransferase (EC 2.4.1.144, N-acetylglucosaminyltransferase III, N-glycosyl-oligosaccharide-glycoprotein N-acetylglucosaminyltransferase III, uridine diphosphoacetylglucosamine-glycopeptide beta4-acetylglucosaminyltransferase III, beta-1,4-mannosyl-glycoprotein beta-1,4-N-acetylglucosaminyltransferase, GnTIII) is an enzyme with systematic name UDP-N-acetyl-D-glucosamine:beta-D-mannosyl-glycoprotein 4-beta-N-acetyl-D-glucosaminyltransferase. This enzyme catalyses the following chemical reaction

UDP-N-acetyl-D-glucosamine + beta-D-mannosyl-R $\rightleftharpoons$ UDP + 4-(N-acetyl-beta-D-glucosaminyl)-beta-D-mannosyl-R

R represents the remainder of the N-linked oligosaccharide in the glycoprotein acceptor.
