= Table of epithelia of human organs =

List of Human Epithelia

This table lists the epithelia of different organs of the human body.

System	Tissue	Epithelium	Subtype
circulatory	blood vessels	Simple squamous	endothelium
digestive	ducts of submandibular glands	simple columnar	-
digestive	attached gingiva	Stratified squamous, keratinized	-
digestive	dorsum of tongue	Stratified squamous, keratinized	-
digestive	hard palate	Stratified squamous, keratinized	-
digestive	oesophagus	Stratified squamous, non-keratinized	-
digestive	stomach	Simple columnar, non-ciliated	gastric epithelium
digestive	small intestine	Simple columnar, non-ciliated	intestinal epithelium
digestive	large intestine	Simple columnar, non-ciliated	intestinal epithelium
digestive	rectum	Simple columnar, non-ciliated	-
digestive	anus	Stratified squamous, non-keratinized superior to Hilton's white line Stratified squamous, keratinized inferior to Hilton's white line	-
digestive	gallbladder	Simple columnar, non-ciliated	-
endocrine	thyroid follicles	Simple cuboidal	-
nervous	ependyma	Simple cuboidal	-
lymphatic	lymph vessel	Simple squamous	endothelium
integumentary	skin - dead superficial layer	Stratified squamous, keratinized	-
integumentary	sweat gland ducts	Stratified cuboidal	-
integumentary	mesothelium of body cavities	Simple squamous	mesothelium
reproductive - female	ovaries	Simple cuboidal	germinal epithelium (female)
reproductive - female	fallopian tubes	Simple columnar, ciliated	-
reproductive - female	endometrium (uterus)	Simple columnar, ciliated	-
reproductive - female	cervix (endocervix)	Simple columnar	-
reproductive - female	cervix (ectocervix)	Stratified squamous, non-keratinized	-
reproductive - female	vaginal epithelium	Stratified squamous, non-keratinized	-
reproductive - female	labia majora	Stratified squamous, keratinized	-
reproductive - male	tubuli recti	Simple cuboidal	germinal epithelium (male)
reproductive - male	rete testis	Simple cuboidal	-
reproductive - male	efferent ducts	Pseudostratified columnar	-
reproductive - male	epididymis	Pseudostratified columnar, with stereocilia	-
reproductive - male	vas deferens	Pseudostratified columnar	-
reproductive - male	ejaculatory duct	Simple columnar	-
reproductive - male (gland)	bulbourethral glands	Simple columnar	-
reproductive - male (gland)	seminal vesicle	Pseudostratified columnar	-
respiratory	oropharynx	Stratified squamous, non-keratinized	-
respiratory	larynx	Pseudostratified columnar, ciliated	respiratory epithelium
respiratory	larynx - true vocal cords	Stratified squamous, non-keratinized	-
respiratory	trachea	Pseudostratified columnar, ciliated	respiratory epithelium
respiratory	bronchi	Pseudostratified columnar, ciliated	
respiratory	terminal bronchioles	Simple cuboidal, ciliated	
respiratory	respiratory bronchioles	Simple cuboidal, ciliated	-
respiratory	alveoli	Simple squamous	
sensory	cornea	Stratified squamous, non-keratinized	corneal epithelium
sensory	nose	Pseudostratified columnar	olfactory epithelium
urinary	kidney - proximal convoluted tubule	Simple cuboidal, with microvilli	-
urinary	kidney - ascending thin limb	Simple squamous	-
urinary	kidney - distal convoluted tubule	Simple cuboidal, without microvilli	-
urinary	kidney - collecting duct	Simple cuboidal	-
urinary	kidney - Bowman's capsule	Simple squamous	-
urinary	kidney - Loop of Henle	Simple squamous	-
urinary	kidney - descending thin limb	Simple squamous	-
urinary	kidney - descending thick limb	simple cuboidal	-
urinary	renal pelvis	Transitional	urothelium
urinary	ureter	Transitional	urothelium
urinary	urinary bladder	Transitional	urothelium
urinary	prostatic urethra	Transitional	urothelium
urinary	membranous urethra	Pseudostratified columnar, non-ciliated	-
urinary	penile urethra	Pseudostratified columnar, non-ciliated	-
urinary	urinary meatus	Stratified squamous	-
