= CA19-9 =

Sialyl-Lewis^{A}

Names
- Systematic IUPAC name (1^{2}S,1^{4}S,1^{5}R,1^{6}R,3^{2}R,3^{3}R,3^{4}S,3^{5}S,3^{6}R,5^{2}R,5^{3}S,5^{4}R,5^{5}R,5^{6}Ξ,7^{2}S,7^{3}S,7^{4}R,7^{5}S,7^{6}S)-1^{5},5^{5}-Diacetamido-1^{4},3^{3},3^{5},5^{6},7^{3},7^{4},7^{5}-heptahydroxy-3^{6},5^{2}-bis(hydroxymethyl)-7^{6}-methyl-1^{6}-[(1R,2R)-1,2,3-trihydroxypropyl]-2,4,6-trioxa-1,7(2),3(4,2),5(4,3)-tetraoxanaheptaphane-1^{2}-carboxylic acid
- Other names sialyl Le^{A}, SLe^{A}, cancer antigen 19-9, CA19-9

Identifiers
CAS Number	92448-22-1
3D model (JSmol)	Interactive image
ChEBI	CHEBI:61793
ChemSpider	9160877
KEGG	G00257
MeSH	sialyl+Lewis+A
PubChem CID	10985677
UNII	ZEJ6FM4UJK
- InChI: InChI=1S/C31H52N2O23/c1-8-17(41)20(44)21(45)28(50-8)53-23-14(7-36)51-27(47)16(33-10(3)38)25(23)54-29-22(46)26(19(43)13(6-35)52-29)56-31(30(48)49)4-11(39)15(32-9(2)37)24(55-31)18(42)12(40)5-34/h8,11-29,34-36,39-47H,4-7H2,1-3H3,(H,32,37)(H,33,38)(H,48,49)/t8-,11-,12+,13+,14+,15+,16+,17+,18+,19-,20+,21-,22+,23+,24+,25+,26-,27?,28-,29-,31-/m0/s1 Key: XBSNXOHQOTUENA-KRAHZTDDSA-N
- SMILES: O=C(O)[C@@]1(O[C@H]2[C@@H](O)[C@@H](CO)O[C@@H](O[C@H]3[C@H](O[C@H]4[C@@H](O)[C@H](O)[C@H](O)[C@H](C)O4)[C@@H](CO)OC(O)[C@@H]3NC(C)=O)[C@@H]2O)C[C@H](O)[C@@H](NC(C)=O)[C@H]([C@H](O)[C@H](O)CO)O1

Properties
Chemical formula	C_{31}H_{52}N_{2}O_{23}
Molar mass	820.748 g·mol^{−1}
- Except where otherwise noted, data are given for materials in their standard state (at 25 °C [77 °F], 100 kPa). verify (what is ?) Infobox references

Carbohydrate antigen 19-9 (CA19-9), also known as sialyl-Lewis^{A}, is a tetrasaccharide which is usually attached to O-glycans on the surface of cells. It is known to play a role in cell-to-cell recognition processes. It is also a tumor marker used primarily in the management of pancreatic cancer.

== Structure ==
CA19-9 is the sialylated form of Lewis antigen^{A}. It is a tetrasaccharide with the sequence Neu5Acα2-3Galβ1-3[Fucα1-4]GlcNAcβ.

== Clinical significance ==
=== Tumor marker ===
Guidelines from the American Society of Clinical Oncology discourage the use of CA19-9 as a screening test for cancer, particularly pancreatic cancer. The reason is that the test may be falsely normal (false negative) in many cases or abnormally elevated in people who have no cancer (false positive) in others. The main use of CA19-9 is therefore to see whether a pancreatic tumor is secreting it; if that is the case, then the levels should fall when the tumor is treated, and they may rise again if the disease recurs. Therefore it is useful as a surrogate marker for relapse.

In people with pancreatic masses, CA19-9 can be useful in distinguishing between cancer and other diseases of the gland.

==== Limitations ====
CA19-9 can be elevated in many types of gastrointestinal cancer, such as colorectal cancer, esophageal cancer and hepatocellular carcinoma. Apart from cancer, elevated levels may occur in pancreatitis, cirrhosis, and diseases of the bile ducts. It can also be elevated in people with obstruction of the bile ducts.

In people who lack Lewis antigen^{A} (a blood type antigen on red blood cells), which is about 10% of the white population, CA19-9 is not produced by any cells, even in those with large tumors. This is because of a deficiency of a fucosyltransferase enzyme that is needed to produce Lewis antigen^{A}.

== History ==
CA19-9 was discovered in the serum of patients with colon cancer and pancreatic cancer in 1981. It was characterized shortly after, and it was found to be carried primarily by mucins.

== See also ==
- Sialyl-Lewis^{X}
- Lewis antigen system
