= Glycoprotein 3-alpha-L-fucosyltransferase =

Class of enzymes

glycoprotein 3-alpha-L-fucosyltransferase

Identifiers
- EC no.: 2.4.1.214
- CAS no.: 68247-53-0

Databases
- IntEnz: IntEnz view
- BRENDA: BRENDA entry
- ExPASy: NiceZyme view
- KEGG: KEGG entry
- MetaCyc: metabolic pathway
- PRIAM: profile
- PDB structures: RCSB PDB PDBe PDBsum
- Gene Ontology: AmiGO / QuickGO
Search
- PMC: articles
- PubMed: articles
- NCBI: proteins

In enzymology, a glycoprotein 3-alpha-L-fucosyltransferase (EC 2.4.1.214) is an enzyme that catalyzes the chemical reaction

GDP-L-fucose + N_{4}-{N-acetyl-beta-D-glucosaminyl-(1->2)-alpha-D-mannosyl-(1->3)-[N- acetyl-beta-D-glucosaminyl-(1->2)-alpha-D-mannosyl-(1->6)]-beta-D- mannosyl-(1->4)-N-acetyl-beta-D-glucosaminyl-(1->4)-N-acetyl-beta-D- glucosaminyl}asparagine $\rightleftharpoons$ GDP + N_{4}-{N-acetyl-beta-D-glucosaminyl-(1->2)-alpha-D-mannosyl-(1->3)-[N- acetyl-beta-D-glucosaminyl-(1->2)-alpha-D-mannosyl-(1->6)]-beta-D- mannosyl-(1->4)-N-acetyl-beta-D-glucosaminyl-(1->4)-[alpha-L- fucosyl-(1->3)]-N-acetyl-beta-D-glucosaminyl}asparagine

The 5 substrates of this enzyme are GDP-L-fucose, [[N4-{N-acetyl-beta-D-glucosaminyl-(1->2)-alpha-D-mannosyl-(1->3)-[N-]], [[acetyl-beta-D-glucosaminyl-(1->2)-alpha-D-mannosyl-(1->6)]-beta-D-]], [[mannosyl-(1->4)-N-acetyl-beta-D-glucosaminyl-(1->4)-N-acetyl-beta-D-]], and [[glucosaminyl}asparagine]], whereas its 5 products are GDP, [[N4-{N-acetyl-beta-D-glucosaminyl-(1->2)-alpha-D-mannosyl-(1->3)-[N-]], [[acetyl-beta-D-glucosaminyl-(1->2)-alpha-D-mannosyl-(1->6)]-beta-D-]], [[mannosyl-(1->4)-N-acetyl-beta-D-glucosaminyl-(1->4)-[alpha-L-]], and [[fucosyl-(1->3)]-N-acetyl-beta-D-glucosaminyl}asparagine]].

This enzyme belongs to the family of glycosyltransferases, specifically the hexosyltransferases. The systematic name of this enzyme class is GDP-L-fucose:glycoprotein (L-fucose to asparagine-linked N-acetylglucosamine of N4-{N-acetyl-beta-D-glucosaminyl-(1->2)-alpha-D-mannosyl-(1->3)-[N-a cetyl-beta-D-glucosaminyl-(1->2)-alpha-D-mannosyl-(1->6)]-beta-D-man nosyl-(1->4)-N-acetyl-beta-D-glucosaminyl-(1->4)-N-acetyl-beta-D-glu cosaminyl}asparagine) 3-alpha-L-fucosyl-transferase. Other names in common use include GDP-L-Fuc:N-acetyl-beta-D-glucosaminide alpha1,3-fucosyltransferase, GDP-L-Fuc:Asn-linked GlcNAc alpha1,3-fucosyltransferase, GDP-fucose:beta-N-acetylglucosamine (Fuc to, (Fucalpha1->6GlcNAc)-Asn-peptide) alpha1->3-fucosyltransferase, GDP-L-fucose:glycoprotein (L-fucose to asparagine-linked, N-acetylglucosamine of, 4-N-{N-acetyl-beta-D-glucosaminyl-(1->2)-alpha-D-mannosyl-(1->3)-[N-, acetyl-beta-D-glucosaminyl-(1->2)-alpha-D-mannosyl-(1->6)]-beta-D-, mannosyl-(1->4)-N-acetyl-beta-D-glucosaminyl-(1->4)-N-acetyl-beta-D-, and glucosaminyl}asparagine) 3-alpha-L-fucosyl-transferase. This enzyme participates in glycan structures - biosynthesis 1.
