= Glycolipid 2-alpha-mannosyltransferase =

Protein family

glycolipid 2-alpha-mannosyltransferase

Identifiers
- EC no.: 2.4.1.131
- CAS no.: 74506-43-7

Databases
- IntEnz: IntEnz view
- BRENDA: BRENDA entry
- ExPASy: NiceZyme view
- KEGG: KEGG entry
- MetaCyc: metabolic pathway
- PRIAM: profile
- PDB structures: RCSB PDB PDBe PDBsum
- Gene Ontology: AmiGO / QuickGO
Search
- PMC: articles
- PubMed: articles
- NCBI: proteins

In enzymology, a glycolipid 2-alpha-mannosyltransferase (EC 2.4.1.131) is an enzyme that catalyzes the chemical reaction in which an alpha-D-mannosyl residue is transferred from GDP-mannose to lipid-linked oligosaccharide, being attached by an alpha-1,2-D-mannosyl-D-mannose bond.

This enzyme belongs to the family of glycosyltransferases, specifically the hexosyltransferases. The systematic name of this enzyme class is GDP-mannose:glycolipid 1,2-alpha-D-mannosyltransferase. Other names in common use include guanosine diphosphomannose-oligosaccharide-lipid, mannosyltransferase, GDP-mannose-oligosaccharide-lipid mannosyltransferase, and oligosaccharide-lipid mannosyltransferase.

== Structural studies ==
As of late 2007, 3 structures have been solved for this class of enzymes, with PDB accession codes 1S4N, 1S4O, and 1S4P.
