= Peptide-O-fucosyltransferase =

Class of enzymes

peptide-O-fucosyltransferase

Identifiers
- EC no.: 2.4.1.221
- CAS no.: 9033-08-3

Databases
- IntEnz: IntEnz view
- BRENDA: BRENDA entry
- ExPASy: NiceZyme view
- KEGG: KEGG entry
- MetaCyc: metabolic pathway
- PRIAM: profile
- PDB structures: RCSB PDB PDBe PDBsum
- Gene Ontology: AmiGO / QuickGO
Search
- PMC: articles
- PubMed: articles
- NCBI: proteins

In enzymology, a peptide-O-fucosyltransferase (EC 2.4.1.221) is an enzyme that catalyzes the chemical reaction in which an alpha-L-fucosylpyranoside residue is transferred from GDP-beta-L-fucose to the sidechain oxygen atom of a serine or threonine residue in a protein.

This enzyme belongs to the family of glycosyltransferases, specifically the hexosyltransferases. The systematic name of this enzyme class is GDP-beta-L-fucose:polypeptide O-alpha-L-fucosyltransferase. Other names in common use include GDP-L-fucose:polypeptide fucosyltransferase, GDP-fucose protein O-fucosyltransferase, and GDP-fucose:polypeptide fucosyltransferase.
