= MGAT3 =

Protein-coding gene in the species Homo sapiens

Identifiers
- Aliases: MGAT3, GNT-III, GNT3, mannosyl (beta-1,4-)-glycoprotein beta-1,4-N-acetylglucosaminyltransferase, beta-1,4-mannosyl-glycoprotein 4-beta-N-acetylglucosaminyltransferase
- External IDs: OMIM: 604621; MGI: 104532; GeneCards: MGAT3
Enzyme activity
EC #	BRENDA	ExPASy	KEGG	MetaCyc
2.4.1.144	↗	↗	↗	↗

Gene location (Human)
Chr.	Chromosome 22 (human)
Band	22q13.1	Start	39,457,012 bp
Band	22q13.1	End	39,492,194 bp

Gene location (Mouse)
Chr.	Chromosome 15 (mouse)
Band	15 E1|15 37.85 cM	Start	80,057,922 bp
Band	15 E1|15 37.85 cM	End	80,099,720 bp
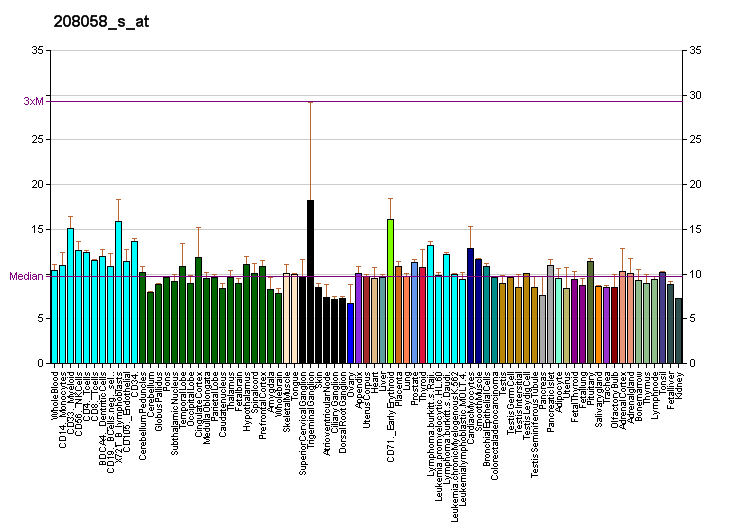
RNA expression pattern
Bgee	Human / Mouse (ortholog); Top expressed in: right hemisphere of cerebellum; right frontal lobe; prefrontal cortex; Brodmann area 9; olfactory bulb; nucleus accumbens; cingulate gyrus; dorsal motor nucleus of vagus nerve; amygdala; anterior cingulate cortex / Top expressed in: dentate gyrus of hippocampal formation granule cell; superior frontal gyrus; right kidney; primary visual cortex; cerebellar cortex; proximal tubule; supraoptic nucleus; lumbar subsegment of spinal cord; facial motor nucleus; ventricular zone; More reference expression data
BioGPS	More reference expression data
Gene ontology
Molecular function	transferase activity; glycosyltransferase activity; beta-1,4-mannosylglycoprotein 4-beta-N-acetylglucosaminyltransferase activity
Cellular component	integral component of membrane; Golgi membrane; Golgi apparatus; membrane
Biological process	protein glycosylation; protein N-linked glycosylation; N-acetylglucosamine metabolic process; protein localization; regulation of cell migration; cellular response to oxidative stress; amyloid-beta metabolic process; cognition; positive regulation of protein localization to early endosome; negative regulation of lysosomal protein catabolic process
Sources:Amigo / QuickGO
Orthologs
Databases	NCBI: entry; OMA: entry
Species	Human	Mouse
Entrez	4248	17309
Ensembl	ENSG00000128268	ENSMUSG00000042428
UniProt	Q09327	Q10470; Q5RKT9
RefSeq (mRNA)	NM_001098270; NM_002409	NM_010795
RefSeq (protein)	NP_001091740; NP_002400	NP_034925
Location (UCSC)	Chr 22: 39.46 – 39.49 Mb	Chr 15: 80.06 – 80.1 Mb
PubMed search
- Wikidata
View/Edit Human	View/Edit Mouse

Beta-1,4-mannosyl-glycoprotein 4-beta-N-acetylglucosaminyltransferase is an enzyme that in humans is encoded by the MGAT3 gene.

There are believed to be over 100 different glycosyltransferases involved in the synthesis of protein-bound and lipid-bound oligosaccharides. The enzyme encoded by this gene transfers a GlcNAc residue to the beta-linked mannose of the trimannosyl core of N-linked oligosaccharides and produces a bisecting GlcNAc. Multiple alternatively spliced variants, encoding the same protein, have been identified.
