= FUT4 =

Mammalian protein found in Homo sapiens

Identifiers
- Aliases: FUT4, CD15, ELFT, FCT3A, FUC-TIV, FUTIV, LeX, SSEA-1, fucosyltransferase 4
- External IDs: OMIM: 104230; MGI: 95594; GeneCards: FUT4
Enzyme activity
EC #	BRENDA	ExPASy	KEGG	MetaCyc
2.4.1.152	↗	↗	↗	↗

Gene location (Human)
Chr.	Chromosome 11 (human)
Band	11q21	Start	94,543,921 bp
Band	11q21	End	94,549,895 bp

Gene location (Mouse)
Chr.	Chromosome 9 (mouse)
Band	9 A2|9 4.3 cM	Start	14,659,616 bp
Band	9 A2|9 4.3 cM	End	14,663,689 bp
RNA expression pattern
Bgee	Human / Mouse (ortholog); Top expressed in: mucosa of sigmoid colon; bone marrow; mucosa of ileum; trabecular bone; monocyte; bone marrow cell; jejunal mucosa; duodenum; gonad; rectum / Top expressed in: left colon; Paneth cell; epithelium of stomach; duodenum; granulocyte; seminal vesicula; transitional epithelium of urinary bladder; jejunum; mesenteric lymph nodes; conjunctival fornix; More reference expression data
BioGPS	n/a
Gene ontology
Molecular function	transferase activity; fucosyltransferase activity; glycosyltransferase activity; alpha-(1->3)-fucosyltransferase activity
Cellular component	integral component of membrane; Golgi cisterna membrane; cell surface; Golgi apparatus; membrane; cell periphery; Golgi membrane
Biological process	protein glycosylation; fucosylation; L-fucose catabolic process; carbohydrate metabolic process
Sources:Amigo / QuickGO
Orthologs
Databases	NCBI: entry; OMA: entry
Species	Human	Mouse
Entrez	2526	14345
Ensembl	ENSG00000196371	ENSMUSG00000049307
UniProt	P22083	Q11127
RefSeq (mRNA)	NM_002033	NM_010242
RefSeq (protein)	NP_002024	NP_034372
Location (UCSC)	Chr 11: 94.54 – 94.55 Mb	Chr 9: 14.66 – 14.66 Mb
PubMed search
- Wikidata
View/Edit Human	View/Edit Mouse

Fucosyltransferase 4 (alpha (1,3) fucosyltransferase, myeloid-specific), also known as FUT4, is an enzyme which in humans is encoded by the FUT4 gene.

== Function ==
The product of this gene transfers fucose to N-acetyllactosamine polysaccharides to generate fucosylated carbohydrate structures. It catalyzes the synthesis of the non-sialylated antigen, Lewis x (CD15).

== See also ==
- Fucosyltransferase 4
