= FUT8 =

Protein-coding gene in the species Homo sapiens

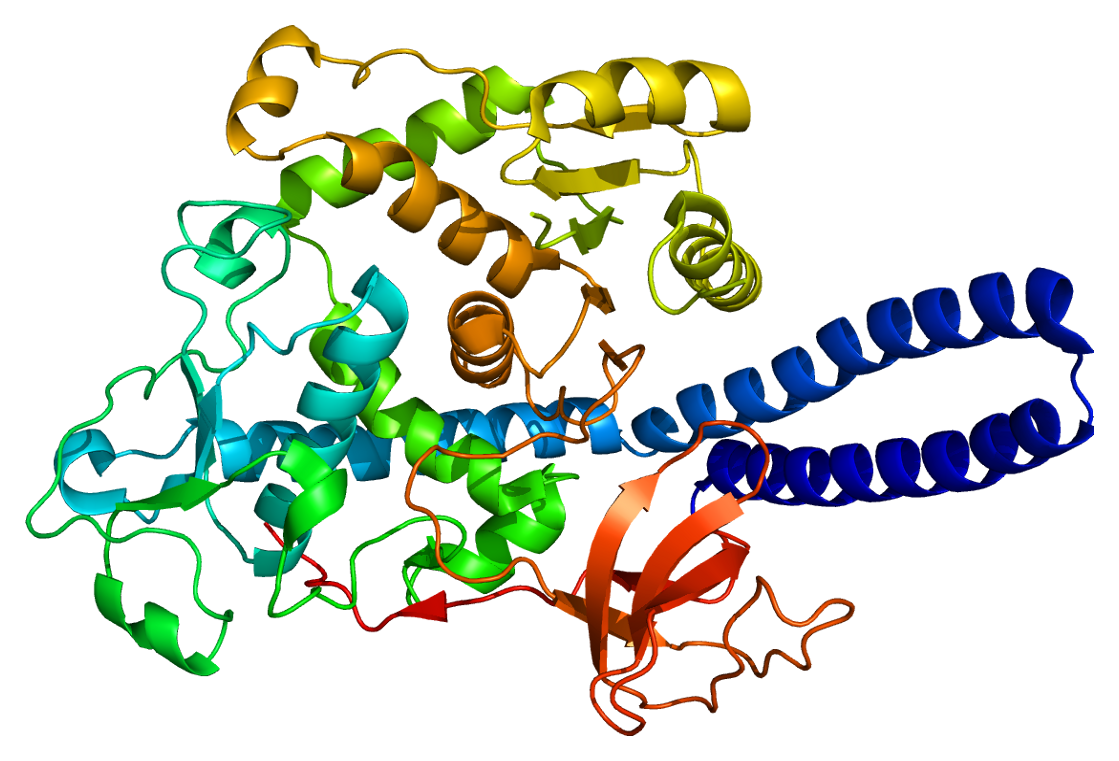

Identifiers
- Aliases: FUT8, fucosyltransferase 8, CDGF, CDGF1
- External IDs: OMIM: 602589; MGI: 1858901; GeneCards: FUT8
Available structures
PDB	Ortholog search: PDBe RCSB
PDB	List of PDB id codes 2DE0
Enzyme activity
EC #	BRENDA	ExPASy	KEGG	MetaCyc
2.4.1.68	↗	↗	↗	↗

Gene location (Human)
Chr.	Chromosome 14 (human)
Band	14q23.3	Start	65,410,592 bp
Band	14q23.3	End	65,744,121 bp

Gene location (Mouse)
Chr.	Chromosome 12 (mouse)
Band	12|12 C3	Start	77,284,899 bp
Band	12|12 C3	End	77,523,112 bp
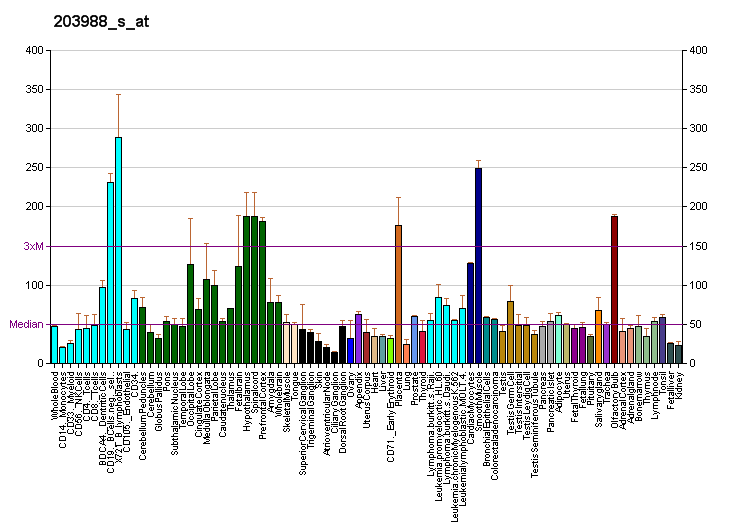
RNA expression pattern
Bgee	Human / Mouse (ortholog); Top expressed in: corpus callosum; olfactory bulb; testicle; trigeminal ganglion; inferior ganglion of vagus nerve; pylorus; ventricular zone; C1 segment; subthalamic nucleus; Achilles tendon / Top expressed in: seminal vesicula; sciatic nerve; olfactory epithelium; left colon; epithelium of stomach; crypt of lieberkuhn of small intestine; optic nerve; lobe of cerebellum; olfactory tubercle; cerebellar vermis; More reference expression data
BioGPS	More reference expression data
Gene ontology
Molecular function	transferase activity; glycosyltransferase activity; SH3 domain binding; glycoprotein 6-alpha-L-fucosyltransferase activity; alpha-(1->6)-fucosyltransferase activity
Cellular component	integral component of membrane; Golgi apparatus; membrane; Golgi membrane; Golgi cisterna membrane; extracellular exosome; cytosol
Biological process	GDP-L-fucose metabolic process; regulation of cellular response to oxidative stress; N-glycan fucosylation; N-glycan processing; in utero embryonic development; respiratory gaseous exchange by respiratory system; protein glycosylation; oligosaccharide biosynthetic process; regulation of gene expression; integrin-mediated signaling pathway; protein N-linked glycosylation; transforming growth factor beta receptor signaling pathway; cell migration; L-fucose catabolic process; receptor metabolic process; protein N-linked glycosylation via asparagine
Sources:Amigo / QuickGO
Orthologs
Databases	NCBI: entry; OMA: entry
Species	Human	Mouse
Entrez	2530	53618
Ensembl	ENSG00000033170	ENSMUSG00000021065
UniProt	Q9BYC5	Q9WTS2
RefSeq (mRNA)	NM_004480; NM_178154; NM_178155; NM_178156; NM_178157 NM_001371533; NM_001371534; NM_001371536	NM_001252614; NM_001252615; NM_001252616; NM_016893
RefSeq (protein)	NP_004471; NP_835368; NP_835369; NP_001358462; NP_001358463 NP_001358465	NP_001239543; NP_001239544; NP_001239545; NP_058589
Location (UCSC)	Chr 14: 65.41 – 65.74 Mb	Chr 12: 77.28 – 77.52 Mb
PubMed search
- Wikidata
View/Edit Human	View/Edit Mouse

The human FUT8 gene encodes the enzyme Alpha-(1,6)-fucosyltransferase.

This enzyme belongs to the family of fucosyltransferases. It catalyzes the transfer of fucose from GDP-fucose to N-linked type complex glycopeptides. This enzyme is distinct from other fucosyltransferases which catalyze alpha1-2, alpha1-3, and alpha1-4 fucose addition to existing oligosaccharides or the four Protein O-fucosyltransferases (POFUTs) that transfer fucose in alpha1-O linkage directly to serines or threonines in specific protein motifs. The expression of this gene may contribute to the malignancy of cancer cells and to their invasive and metastatic capabilities. Alternatively spliced variants encoding different isoforms have been identified.

Kyowa Hakko Kirin's "Potelligent" platform uses a CHO cell line in which FUT8 has been knocked out to make afucosylated monoclonal antibodies.
