= FUT9 =

Protein-coding gene in the species Homo sapiens

Identifiers
- Aliases: FUT9, Fuc-TIX, fucosyltransferase 9
- External IDs: OMIM: 606865; MGI: 1330859; GeneCards: FUT9
Enzyme activity
EC #	BRENDA	ExPASy	KEGG	MetaCyc
2.4.1.152	↗	↗	↗	↗

Gene location (Human)
Chr.	Chromosome 6 (human)
Band	6q16.1	Start	96,015,974 bp
Band	6q16.1	End	96,215,612 bp

Gene location (Mouse)
Chr.	Chromosome 4 (mouse)
Band	4 A3|4 10.59 cM	Start	25,609,332 bp
Band	4 A3|4 10.59 cM	End	25,800,244 bp
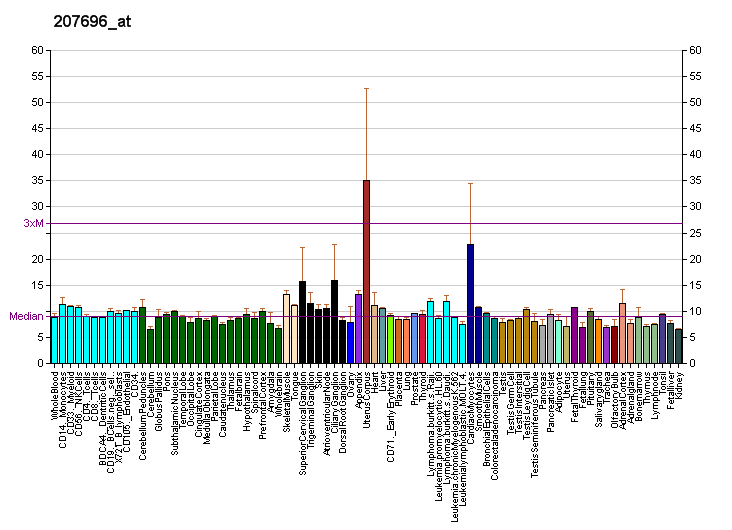
RNA expression pattern
Bgee	Human / Mouse (ortholog); Top expressed in: pylorus; cerebellar vermis; Brodmann area 46; endothelial cell; orbitofrontal cortex; postcentral gyrus; Brodmann area 23; middle temporal gyrus; entorhinal cortex; pars reticulata / Top expressed in: lobe of cerebellum; cerebellar vermis; lateral geniculate nucleus; medial geniculate nucleus; dorsal tegmental nucleus; medial dorsal nucleus; lateral hypothalamus; medial vestibular nucleus; deep cerebellar nuclei; globus pallidus; More reference expression data
BioGPS	More reference expression data
Gene ontology
Molecular function	glycosyltransferase activity; alpha-(1->3)-fucosyltransferase activity; fucosyltransferase activity; transferase activity
Cellular component	integral component of membrane; Golgi apparatus; Golgi cisterna membrane; membrane; Golgi membrane
Biological process	L-fucose catabolic process; fucosylation; nervous system development; protein glycosylation; carbohydrate metabolic process
Sources:Amigo / QuickGO
Orthologs
Databases	NCBI: entry; OMA: entry
Species	Human	Mouse
Entrez	10690	14348
Ensembl	ENSG00000172461	ENSMUSG00000055373
UniProt	Q9Y231	O88819
RefSeq (mRNA)	NM_006581	NM_010243
RefSeq (protein)	NP_006572	NP_034373
Location (UCSC)	Chr 6: 96.02 – 96.22 Mb	Chr 4: 25.61 – 25.8 Mb
PubMed search
- Wikidata
View/Edit Human	View/Edit Mouse

Alpha-(1,3)-fucosyltransferase is an enzyme that in humans is encoded by the FUT9 gene.

FUT9 is one of several alpha-3-fucosyltransferases that can catalyze the last step in the biosynthesis of Lewis antigen, the addition of a fucose to precursor polysaccharides. FUT9 synthesizes the LeX oligosaccharide (CD15), which is expressed in organ buds progressing in mesenchyma during human embryogenesis.[supplied by OMIM]
