= Glycoprotein 6-alpha-L-fucosyltransferase =

InterPro Family

glycoprotein 6-alpha-L-fucosyltransferase

Identifiers
- EC no.: 2.4.1.68
- CAS no.: 9033-08-3

Databases
- IntEnz: IntEnz view
- BRENDA: BRENDA entry
- ExPASy: NiceZyme view
- KEGG: KEGG entry
- MetaCyc: metabolic pathway
- PRIAM: profile
- PDB structures: RCSB PDB PDBe PDBsum
- Gene Ontology: AmiGO / QuickGO
Search
- PMC: articles
- PubMed: articles
- NCBI: proteins

In enzymology, a glycoprotein 6-alpha-L-fucosyltransferase (EC 2.4.1.68) is an enzyme that catalyzes the chemical reaction

GDP-L-fucose + N_{4}-{N-acetyl-beta-D-glucosaminyl-(1->2)-alpha-D-mannosyl-(1->3)-[N- acetyl-beta-D-glucosaminyl-(1->2)-alpha-D-mannosyl-(1->6)]-beta-D- mannosyl-(1->4)-N-acetyl-beta-D-glucosaminyl-(1->4)-N-acetyl-beta-D- glucosaminyl}asparagine $\rightleftharpoons$ GDP + N_{4}-{N-acetyl-beta-D-glucosaminyl-(1->2)-alpha-D-mannosyl-(1->3)-[N- acetyl-beta-D-glucosaminyl-(1->2)-alpha-D-mannosyl-(1->6)]-beta-D- mannosyl-(1->4)-N-acetyl-beta-D-glucosaminyl-(1->4)-[alpha-L- fucosyl-(1->6)]-N-acetyl-beta-D-glucosaminyl}asparagine

The 2 substrates of this enzyme are GDP-L-fucose and N4-{N-acetyl-beta-D-glucosaminyl-(1->2)-alpha-D-mannosyl-(1->3)-[N-acetyl-beta-D-glucosaminyl-(1->2)-alpha-D-mannosyl-(1->6)]-beta-D-mannosyl-(1->4)-N-acetyl-beta-D-glucosaminyl-(1->4)-N-acetyl-beta-D-glucosaminyl}asparagine, and its 2 products are GDP and N4-{N-acetyl-beta-D-glucosaminyl-(1->2)-alpha-D-mannosyl-(1->3)-[N-acetyl-beta-D-glucosaminyl-(1->2)-alpha-D-mannosyl-(1->6)]-beta-D-mannosyl-(1->4)-N-acetyl-beta-D-glucosaminyl-(1->4)-[alpha-L-fucosyl-(1->6)]-N-acetyl-beta-D-glucosaminyl}asparagine.

This enzyme belongs to the family of glycosyltransferases, specifically the hexosyltransferases. The systematic name of this enzyme class is GDP-L-fucose:glycoprotein (L-fucose to asparagine-linked N-acetylglucosamine of N4-{N-acetyl-beta-D-glucosaminyl-(1->2)-alpha-D-mannosyl-(1->3)-[N-a cetyl-beta-D-glucosaminyl-(1->2)-alpha-D-mannosyl-(1->6)]-beta-D-man nosyl-(1->4)-N-acetyl-beta-D-glucosaminyl-(1->4)-N-acetyl-beta-D-glu cosaminyl}asparagine) 6-alpha-L-fucosyltransferase. Other names in common use include GDP-fucose-glycoprotein fucosyltransferase, GDP-L-Fuc:N-acetyl-beta-D-glucosaminide alpha1->6fucosyltransferase, GDP-L-fucose-glycoprotein fucosyltransferase, glycoprotein fucosyltransferase, guanosine diphosphofucose-glycoprotein fucosyltransferase, GDP-L-fucose:glycoprotein (L-fucose to asparagine-linked, N-acetylglucosamine of, 4-N-{N-acetyl-beta-D-glucosaminyl-(1->2)-alpha-D-mannosyl-(1->3)-[N-, acetyl-beta-D-glucosaminyl-(1->2)-alpha-D-mannosyl-(1->6)]-beta-D-, mannosyl-(1->4)-N-acetyl-beta-D-glucosaminyl-(1->4)-N-acetyl-beta-D-, glucosaminyl}asparagine) 6-alpha-L-fucosyltransferase, and FucT. This enzyme participates in 3 metabolic pathways: n-glycan biosynthesis, keratan sulfate biosynthesis, and glycan structures - biosynthesis 1.

== Structural studies ==
As of late 2007, 3 structures have been solved for this class of enzymes, with PDB accession codes 2DE0, 2HHC, and 2HLH.
