= Hexosyltransferase =

Class of enzymes

Hexosyltransferases are a type of glycosyltransferase that catalyze the transfer of a hexose.

Examples include:

- glucosyltransferases - transfer glucose
- galactosyltransferases - transfer galactose
- fucosyltransferases - transfer fucose
- glucuronosyltransferase - transfer glucuronic acid
- fructosyltransferase - transfer fructose

They are classified under EC number 2.4.1.
