= FUT6 =

Protein-coding gene in the species Homo sapiens

Identifiers
- Aliases: FUT6, FCT3A, FT1A, Fuc-TVI, FucT-VI, fucosyltransferase 6
- External IDs: OMIM: 136836; GeneCards: FUT6
Enzyme activity
EC #	BRENDA	ExPASy	KEGG	MetaCyc
2.4.1.152	↗	↗	↗	↗

Gene location (Human)
Chr.	Chromosome 19 (human)
Band	19p13.3	Start	5,830,408 bp
Band	19p13.3	End	5,839,722 bp
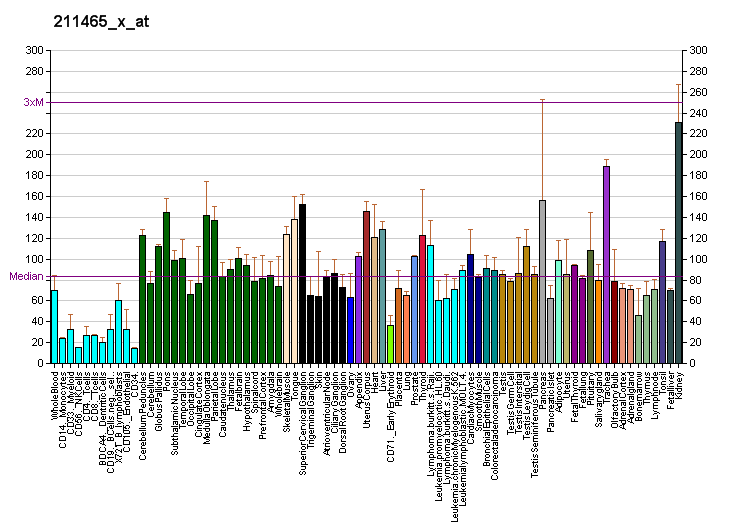

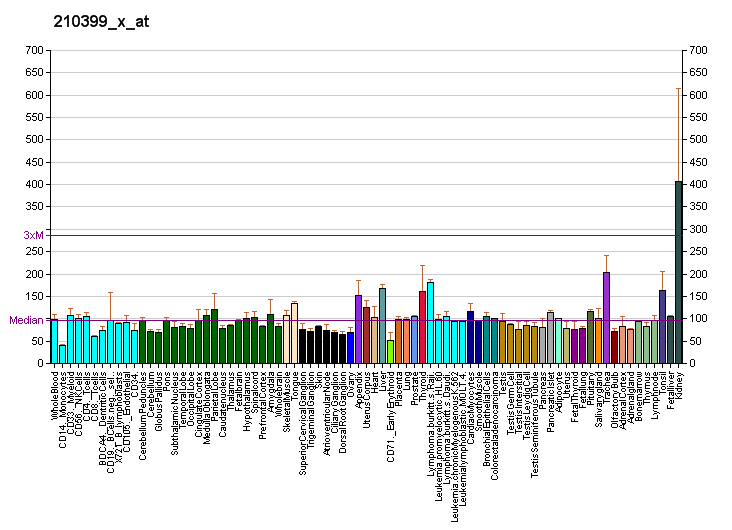
RNA expression pattern
Bgee	Human / Mouse (ortholog); Top expressed in: mucosa of pharynx; olfactory bulb; buccal mucosa cell; pancreatic ductal cell; nasal epithelium; mucosa of ileum; amniotic fluid; trachea; oral cavity; mucosa of transverse colon / n/a; More reference expression data
BioGPS	More reference expression data
Gene ontology
Molecular function	transferase activity; alpha-(1->3)-fucosyltransferase activity; 3-galactosyl-N-acetylglucosaminide 4-alpha-L-fucosyltransferase activity; glycosyltransferase activity; fucosyltransferase activity
Cellular component	integral component of membrane; Golgi cisterna membrane; Golgi apparatus; extracellular exosome; membrane; Golgi membrane
Biological process	protein glycosylation; L-fucose catabolic process; fucosylation; ceramide metabolic process
Sources:Amigo / QuickGO
Orthologs
Databases	NCBI: entry; OMA: entry
Species	Human	Mouse
Entrez	2528	n/a
Ensembl	ENSG00000156413	n/a
UniProt	P51993	n/a
RefSeq (mRNA)	NM_000150; NM_001040701; NM_001369502; NM_001369504; NM_001369505 NM_001381955; NM_001381956; NM_001381957; NM_001381958; NM_001381959	n/a
RefSeq (protein)	NP_000141; NP_001035791; NP_001356431; NP_001356433; NP_001356434 NP_001368884; NP_001368885; NP_001368886; NP_001368887; NP_001368888	n/a
Location (UCSC)	Chr 19: 5.83 – 5.84 Mb	n/a
PubMed search		n/a
- Wikidata
View/Edit Human

Alpha-(1,3)-fucosyltransferase is an enzyme that in humans is encoded by the FUT6 gene.

The alpha-1,3-fucosyltransferases constitute a large family of glycosyltransferases with a high degree of homology. The enzymes of this family comprise 3 main activity patterns called myeloid, plasma, and Lewis, based on their capacity to transfer alpha-L-fucose to distinct oligosaccharide acceptors, their sensitivity to N-ethylmaleimide inhibition, their cation requirements, and their tissue-specific expression patterns. The different categories of alpha-1,3-fucosyltransferases are sequentially expressed during embryo-fetal development.[supplied by OMIM]
