= 4-galactosyl-N-acetylglucosaminide 3-alpha-L-fucosyltransferase =

Class of enzymes

Identifiers
- EC no.: 2.4.1.152
- CAS no.: 111310-38-4

Databases
- IntEnz: IntEnz view
- BRENDA: BRENDA entry
- ExPASy: NiceZyme view
- KEGG: KEGG entry
- MetaCyc: metabolic pathway
- PRIAM: profile
- PDB structures: RCSB PDB PDBe PDBsum
- Gene Ontology: AmiGO / QuickGO
Search
- PMC: articles
- PubMed: articles
- NCBI: proteins

In enzymology, a 4-galactosyl-N-acetylglucosaminide 3-alpha-L-fucosyltransferase (EC 2.4.1.152) is an enzyme that catalyzes the chemical reaction

GDP-beta-L-fucose + 1,4-beta-D-galactosyl-N-acetyl-D-glucosaminyl-R $\rightleftharpoons$ GDP + 1,4-beta-D-galactosyl-(alpha-1,3-L-fucosyl)-N-acetyl-D-glucosaminyl- R

Thus, the two substrates of this enzyme are GDP-beta-L-fucose and 1,4-beta-D-galactosyl-N-acetyl-D-glucosaminyl-R. Its 3 products are GDP, 1,4-beta-D-galactosyl-(alpha-1,3-L-fucosyl)-N-acetyl-D-glucosaminyl-, and R.

This enzyme belongs to the family of glycosyltransferases, specifically the hexosyltransferases. The systematic name of this enzyme class is GDP-beta-L-fucose:1,4-beta-D-galactosyl-N-acetyl-D-glucosaminyl-R 3-alpha-L-fucosyltransferase. Other names in common use include:

- Lewis-negative alpha-3-fucosyltransferase
- plasma alpha-3-fucosyltransferase
- guanosine diphosphofucose-glucoside alpha1→3-fucosyltransferase
- galactoside 3-fucosyltransferase
- GDP-L-fucose:1,4-beta-D-galactosyl-N-acetyl-D-glucosaminyl-R
- 3-L-fucosyltransferase
- GDP-beta-L-fucose:1,4-beta-D-galactosyl-N-acetyl-D-glucosaminyl-R, and
- 3-L-fucosyltransferase

This enzyme participates in 3 metabolic pathways: glycosphingolipid biosynthesis - neo-lactoseries, glycosphingolipid biosynthesis - globoseries, and glycan structures - biosynthesis 2.

== Structural studies ==
As of late 2007, 3 structures have been solved for this class of enzymes, with PDB accession codes 2NZW, 2NZX, and 2NZY.
