= FUT7 =

Protein-coding gene in the species Homo sapiens

Identifiers
- Aliases: FUT7, FucT-VII, fucosyltransferase 7
- External IDs: OMIM: 602030; MGI: 107692; GeneCards: FUT7

Gene location (Human)
Chr.	Chromosome 9 (human)
Band	9q34.3	Start	137,030,174 bp
Band	9q34.3	End	137,032,088 bp

Gene location (Mouse)
Chr.	Chromosome 2 (mouse)
Band	2|2 A3	Start	25,313,279 bp
Band	2|2 A3	End	25,316,386 bp
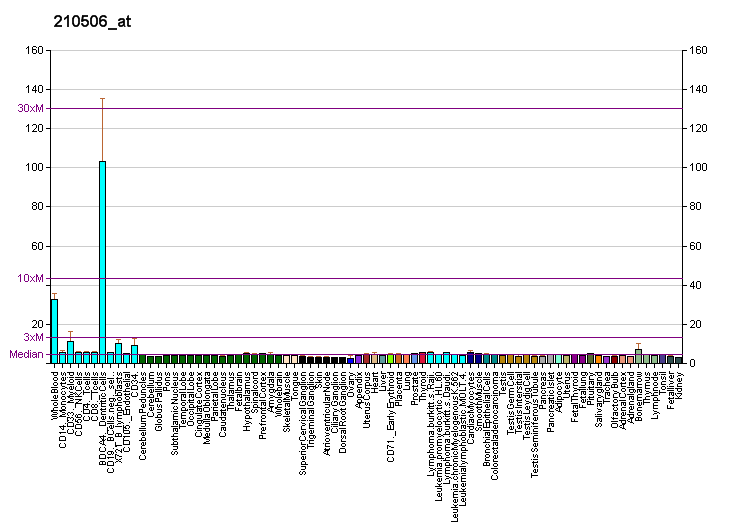

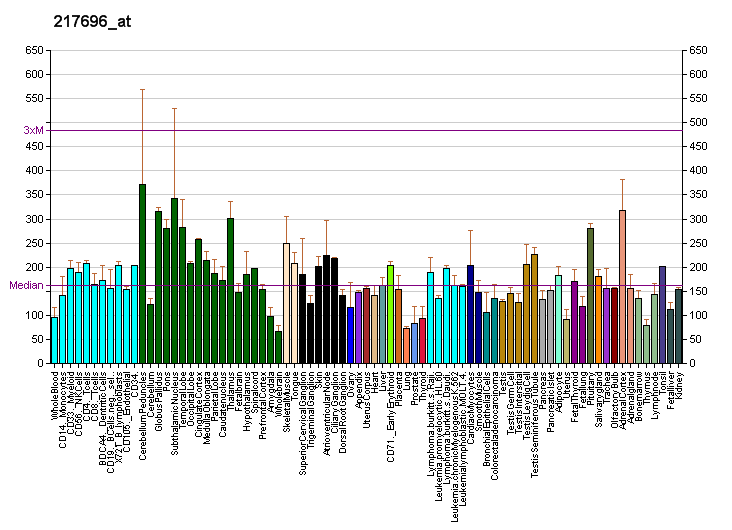
RNA expression pattern
Bgee	Human / Mouse (ortholog); Top expressed in: olfactory bulb; beta cell; vena cava; body of tongue; cardia; parotid gland; lateral nuclear group of thalamus; triceps brachii muscle; subthalamic nucleus; pericardium / Top expressed in: granulocyte; embryo; embryo; CA3 field; bone marrow; thymus; lens; primary visual cortex; duodenum; dentate gyrus of hippocampal formation granule cell; More reference expression data
BioGPS	More reference expression data
Gene ontology
Molecular function	transferase activity; glycosyltransferase activity; fucosyltransferase activity; alpha-(1->3)-fucosyltransferase activity
Cellular component	integral component of membrane; Golgi cisterna membrane; membrane; Golgi membrane; Golgi apparatus
Biological process	leukocyte migration involved in immune response; CD4-positive, CD25-positive, alpha-beta regulatory T cell differentiation; L-fucose catabolic process; fucosylation; ceramide metabolic process; protein glycosylation
Sources:Amigo / QuickGO
Orthologs
Databases	NCBI: entry; OMA: entry
Species	Human	Mouse
Entrez	2529	14347
Ensembl	ENSG00000180549	ENSMUSG00000036587
UniProt	Q11130	Q11131
RefSeq (mRNA)	NM_004479	NM_001177366; NM_001177367; NM_001289453; NM_001289454; NM_001289455 NM_001289456; NM_013524
RefSeq (protein)	NP_004470	NP_001170837; NP_001170838; NP_001276382; NP_001276383; NP_001276384 NP_001276385; NP_038552
Location (UCSC)	Chr 9: 137.03 – 137.03 Mb	Chr 2: 25.31 – 25.32 Mb
PubMed search
- Wikidata
View/Edit Human	View/Edit Mouse

Alpha-(1,3)-fucosyltransferase is an enzyme that in humans is encoded by the FUT7 gene.

== Function ==
The sialyl Lewis x oligosaccharide determinant is an essential component of leukocyte counterreceptors for E-selectin- (MIM 131210) and P-selectin- (MIM 173610) mediated adhesions of leukocytes. This oligosaccharide molecule is displayed on the surfaces of granulocytes, monocytes, and natural killer cells. Formation of leukocyte adhesions to these selectins is an early and important step in the process that ultimately allows leukocytes to leave the vascular tree and become recruited into lymphoid tissues and sites of inflammation.[supplied by OMIM]
