= 3-Galactosyl-N-acetylglucosaminide 4-alpha-L-fucosyltransferase =

Class of enzymes

3-galactosyl-N-acetylglucosaminide 4-alpha-L-fucosyltransferase

Identifiers
- EC no.: 2.4.1.65
- CAS no.: 37277-69-3

Databases
- IntEnz: IntEnz view
- BRENDA: BRENDA entry
- ExPASy: NiceZyme view
- KEGG: KEGG entry
- MetaCyc: metabolic pathway
- PRIAM: profile
- PDB structures: RCSB PDB PDBe PDBsum
- Gene Ontology: AmiGO / QuickGO
Search
- PMC: articles
- PubMed: articles
- NCBI: proteins

In enzymology, a 3-galactosyl-N-acetylglucosaminide 4-alpha-L-fucosyltransferase (EC 2.4.1.65) is an enzyme that catalyzes the chemical reaction

GDP-beta-L-fucose + beta-D-galactosyl-(1->3)-N-acetyl-D-glucosaminyl-R $\rightleftharpoons$ GDP + beta-D-galactosyl-(1->3)-[alpha-L-fucosyl-(1->4)]-N-acetyl-beta-D- glucosaminyl-R

Thus, the two substrates of this enzyme are GDP-beta-L-fucose and [[beta-D-galactosyl-(1->3)-N-acetyl-D-glucosaminyl-R]], whereas its 3 products are GDP, [[beta-D-galactosyl-(1->3)-[alpha-L-fucosyl-(1->4)]-N-acetyl-beta-D-]], and glucosaminyl-R.

This enzyme participates in 3 metabolic pathways: glycosphingolipid biosynthesis - lactoseries, glycosphingolipid biosynthesis - neo-lactoseries, and glycan structures - biosynthesis 2.

== Nomenclature ==
This enzyme belongs to the family of glycosyltransferases, specifically the hexosyltransferases. The systematic name of this enzyme class is GDP-L-fucose:3-beta-D-galactosyl-N-acetyl-D-glucosaminyl-R 4I-alpha-L-fucosyltransferase. Other names in common use include:

- (Lea)-dependent (alpha-3/4)-fucosyltransferase,
- alpha(1,3/1,4) fucosyltransferase III,
- alpha-(1->4)-L-fucosyltransferase,
- alpha-4-L-fucosyltransferase,
- beta-acetylglucosaminylsaccharide fucosyltransferase,
- FucT-II,
- Lewis alpha-(1->3/4)-fucosyltransferase,
- Lewis blood group alpha-(1->3/4)-fucosyltransferase,
- Lewis(Le) blood group gene-dependent,
- alpha-(1->3/4)-L-fucosyltransferase,
- blood group Lewis alpha-4-fucosyltransferase,
- blood-group substance Lea-dependent fucosyltransferase,
- guanosine diphosphofucose-beta-acetylglucosaminylsaccharide,
- 4-alpha-L-fucosyltransferase,
- guanosine diphosphofucose-glycoprotein 4-alpha-L-fucosyltransferase,
- guanosine diphosphofucose-glycoprotein 4-alpha-fucosyltransferase,
- 3-alpha-galactosyl-N-acetylglucosaminide,
- 4-alpha-L-fucosyltransferase,
- GDP-beta-L-fucose:3-beta-D-galactosyl-N-acetyl-D-glucosaminyl-R, and 4I-alpha-L-fucosyltransferase.
