= FUT5 =

Protein-coding gene in the species Homo sapiens

Identifiers
- Aliases: FUT5, FUC-TV, fucosyltransferase 5
- External IDs: OMIM: 136835; GeneCards: FUT5
Enzyme activity
EC #	BRENDA	ExPASy	KEGG	MetaCyc
2.4.1.65	↗	↗	↗	↗
2.4.1.152	↗	↗	↗	↗

Gene location (Human)
Chr.	Chromosome 19 (human)
Band	19p13.3	Start	5,865,826 bp
Band	19p13.3	End	5,870,540 bp
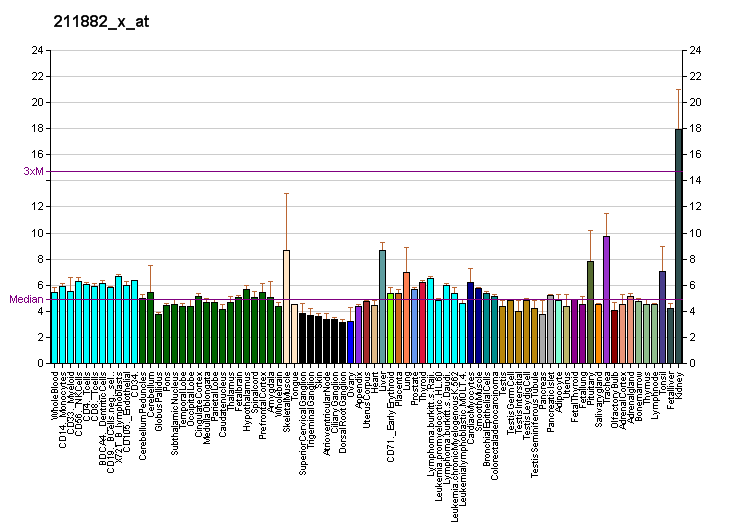

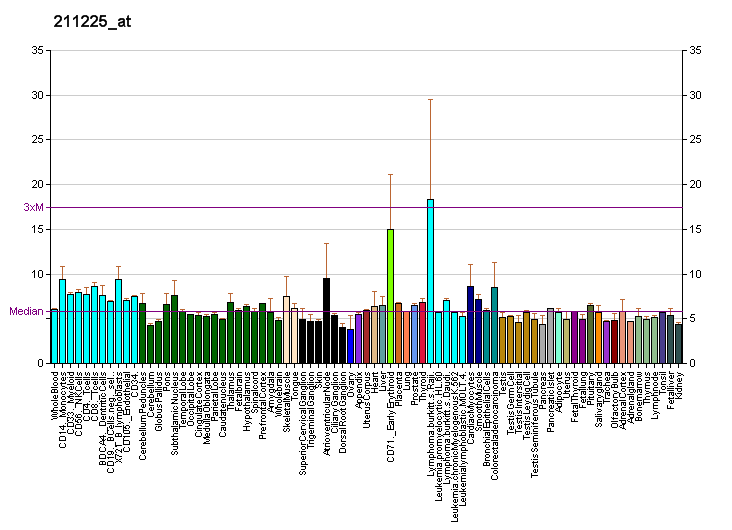
RNA expression pattern
Bgee	Human / Mouse (ortholog); Top expressed in: bone marrow; right lobe of liver; anterior pituitary; skin of leg; testicle; islet of Langerhans; left testis; right testis; head; skin of abdomen / n/a; More reference expression data
BioGPS	More reference expression data
Gene ontology
Molecular function	transferase activity; alpha-(1->3)-fucosyltransferase activity; 3-galactosyl-N-acetylglucosaminide 4-alpha-L-fucosyltransferase activity; glycosyltransferase activity; fucosyltransferase activity
Cellular component	integral component of membrane; Golgi cisterna membrane; Golgi apparatus; membrane; Golgi membrane
Biological process	protein glycosylation; L-fucose catabolic process; fucosylation; ceramide metabolic process; carbohydrate metabolic process
Sources:Amigo / QuickGO
Orthologs
Databases	NCBI: entry; OMA: entry
Species	Human	Mouse
Entrez	2527	n/a
Ensembl	ENSG00000130383	n/a
UniProt	Q11128	n/a
RefSeq (mRNA)	NM_002034	n/a
RefSeq (protein)	NP_002025	n/a
Location (UCSC)	Chr 19: 5.87 – 5.87 Mb	n/a
PubMed search		n/a
- Wikidata
View/Edit Human

Alpha-(1,3)-fucosyltransferase is an enzyme that in humans is encoded by the FUT5 gene.
