= Fucosyltransferase 3 =

Protein and coding gene in humans

FUT3

Identifiers
- Aliases: FUT3, CD174, FT3B, FucT-III, LE, Les, Fucosyltransferase 3, fucosyltransferase 3 (Lewis blood group)
- External IDs: GeneCards: FUT3
Enzyme activity
EC #	BRENDA	ExPASy	KEGG	MetaCyc
2.4.1.65	↗	↗	↗	↗
2.4.1.152	↗	↗	↗	↗

Gene location (Human)
Chr.	Chromosome 19 (human)
Band	19p13.3	Start	5,842,888 bp
Band	19p13.3	End	5,851,474 bp
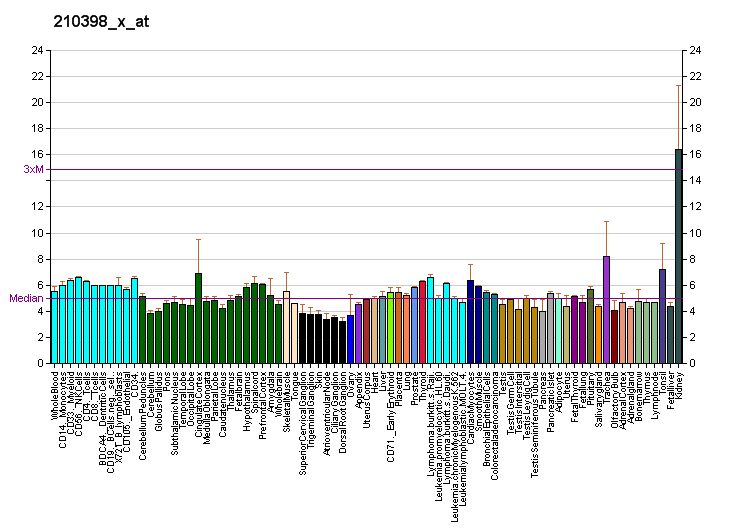

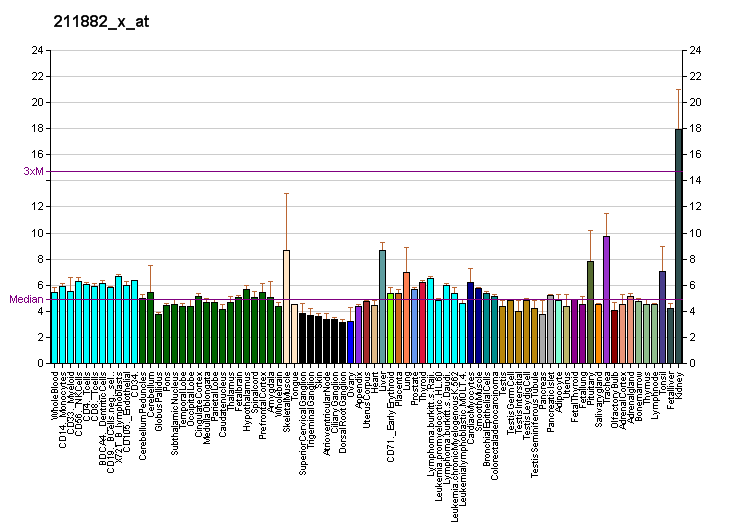

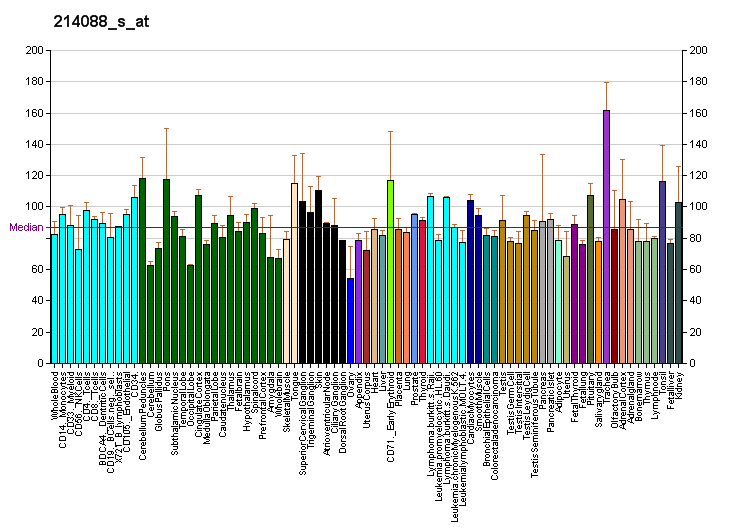
RNA expression pattern
Bgee	Human / Mouse (ortholog); Top expressed in: mucosa of transverse colon; nasal epithelium; mucosa of ileum; oral cavity; rectum; minor salivary glands; mucosa of pharynx; buccal mucosa cell; duodenum; amniotic fluid / n/a; More reference expression data
BioGPS	More reference expression data
Gene ontology
Molecular function	transferase activity; alpha-(1->3)-fucosyltransferase activity; fucosyltransferase activity; glycosyltransferase activity; 3-galactosyl-N-acetylglucosaminide 4-alpha-L-fucosyltransferase activity
Cellular component	integral component of membrane; Golgi cisterna membrane; Golgi apparatus; extracellular exosome; membrane; Golgi membrane
Biological process	cell-cell recognition; oligosaccharide biosynthetic process; protein glycosylation; macromolecule glycosylation; fucosylation; ceramide metabolic process
Sources:Amigo / QuickGO
Orthologs
Databases	NCBI: entry; OMA: entry
Species	Human	Mouse
Entrez	2525	n/a
Ensembl	ENSG00000171124	n/a
UniProt	P21217	n/a
RefSeq (mRNA)	NM_000149; NM_001097639; NM_001097640; NM_001097641; NM_001374740	n/a
RefSeq (protein)	NP_000140; NP_001091108; NP_001091109; NP_001091110; NP_001361669 NP_001369673; NP_001369674; NP_001369675; NP_001369676; NP_001369677; NP_001369678; NP_001369679	n/a
Location (UCSC)	Chr 19: 5.84 – 5.85 Mb	n/a
PubMed search		n/a
- Wikidata
View/Edit Human

Galactoside 3(4)-L-fucosyltransferase is an enzyme that, in humans, is encoded by the FUT3 gene.

== Function ==
The Lewis histo-blood group system comprises a set of fucosylated glycosphingolipids synthesized by exocrine epithelial cells and circulating in body fluids. These glycosphingolipids play essential roles in embryogenesis, tissue differentiation, tumor metastasis, inflammation, and bacterial adhesion. They are secondarily absorbed onto red blood cells, giving rise to the Lewis phenotype.

This gene is a member of the fucosyltransferase family, which catalyzes the addition of fucose to precursor polysaccharides during the final step of Lewis antigen biosynthesis. It encodes an enzyme with both alpha(1,3)-fucosyltransferase and alpha(1,4)-fucosyltransferase activities. Mutations in this gene are responsible for most Lewis antigen-negative phenotypes. Multiple alternatively spliced variants encoding the same protein have been identified for this gene.

== See also ==
- Cluster of differentiation
