= Secretor status =

Secretion of blood group antigens

Secretor status refers to the presence or absence of water-soluble ABO blood group antigens in a person's bodily fluids, such as saliva, tears, breast milk, urine, and semen. People who secrete these antigens in their bodily fluids are referred to as secretors, while people who do not are termed non-secretors. Secretor status is controlled by the FUT2 gene (also called the Se gene), and the secretor phenotype is inherited in an autosomal dominant manner, being expressed by individuals who have at least one functioning copy of the gene. The non-secretor phenotype (se) is a recessive trait. Approximately 80% of White people are secretors, while 20% are non-secretors. Non-secretors have reduced susceptibility to the most common strains of norovirus. Expression of the antigens in the Lewis blood group is also affected by secretor status: non-secretors cannot produce the Le(b) antigen.

== Genetics ==
The expression of ABO blood group antigens is determined by the interaction of three genes: the ABO gene, which controls expression of the A and B antigens; the FUT1 or H gene, which controls expression of the H antigen, the precursor of ABO antigens; and the secretor gene, FUT2 or Se. All of these genes encode glycosyltransferases, which are enzymes that add sugars to precursor substances to create new substances.

The H antigen is required for ABO blood group antigens to be formed. (Note: Individuals who are negative for the H gene express the rare Bombay blood type.) The Se gene, which encodes the enzyme α-2-L-fucosyltransferase, controls the formation of H antigen in bodily secretions. In people with the secretor genotype, the enzyme converts a precursor substance found in body fluids to the H antigen, which is then modified by the glycosyltransferases encoded by the ABO gene to produce the antigens corresponding to the person's ABO blood type. Because non-secretors cannot form H antigen in body fluids, they cannot express soluble ABO antigens.

Lewis blood group phenotypes are controlled by the FUT3 or Le gene and the Se gene. There are two major antigens in the Lewis system: Le(a) and Le(b). Individuals who are negative for Le express neither antigen and their blood type is designated as Le(a-b-). In individuals who are positive for Le, the blood type is determined by the person's secretor status. The Le gene encodes a glycosyltransferase that produces the Le(a) antigen from a precursor substance. In secretors, α-2-L-fucosyltransferase modifies this precursor substance, which causes it to form Le(b) when acted on by the enzyme encoded by the Le gene. Thus, secretors who are positive for Le express the Le(a-b+) type, while non-secretors who are positive for Le express the Le(a+b-) blood type. (Note: A weak variant of the Se gene found mainly in Asian populations results in a Le(a+b+) blood type.)

== Clinical significance ==
Noroviruses bind to secreted blood group antigens on the mucosa of the digestive tract. Because non-secretors do not express these antigens, they exhibit decreased susceptibility to most strains of the disease.

Secretor status can be determined through genotyping or through serologic methods. In the serologic method, the person's saliva is boiled, then added to reagents containing antibodies against the A, B, and H antigens. Red blood cells expressing these antigens are then added to the saliva-reagent mixtures. If the person is a secretor, the antibodies will bind to the antigens in their saliva rather than the red blood cells, and will not cause red blood cells to agglutinate.

Secretor status testing was historically used in forensic science, but this has been made obsolete by advances in DNA testing.

== Prevalence ==
Approximately 80% of Caucasian people possess the Se gene and are secretors; the other 20% are non-secretors. The frequency of the Se gene is approximately 50% in most ethnic groups, but Aboriginal Australians, Inuit, and some Native American and Melanesian groups exhibit a frequency of nearly 100%, while the frequency is only 22% in South India.
