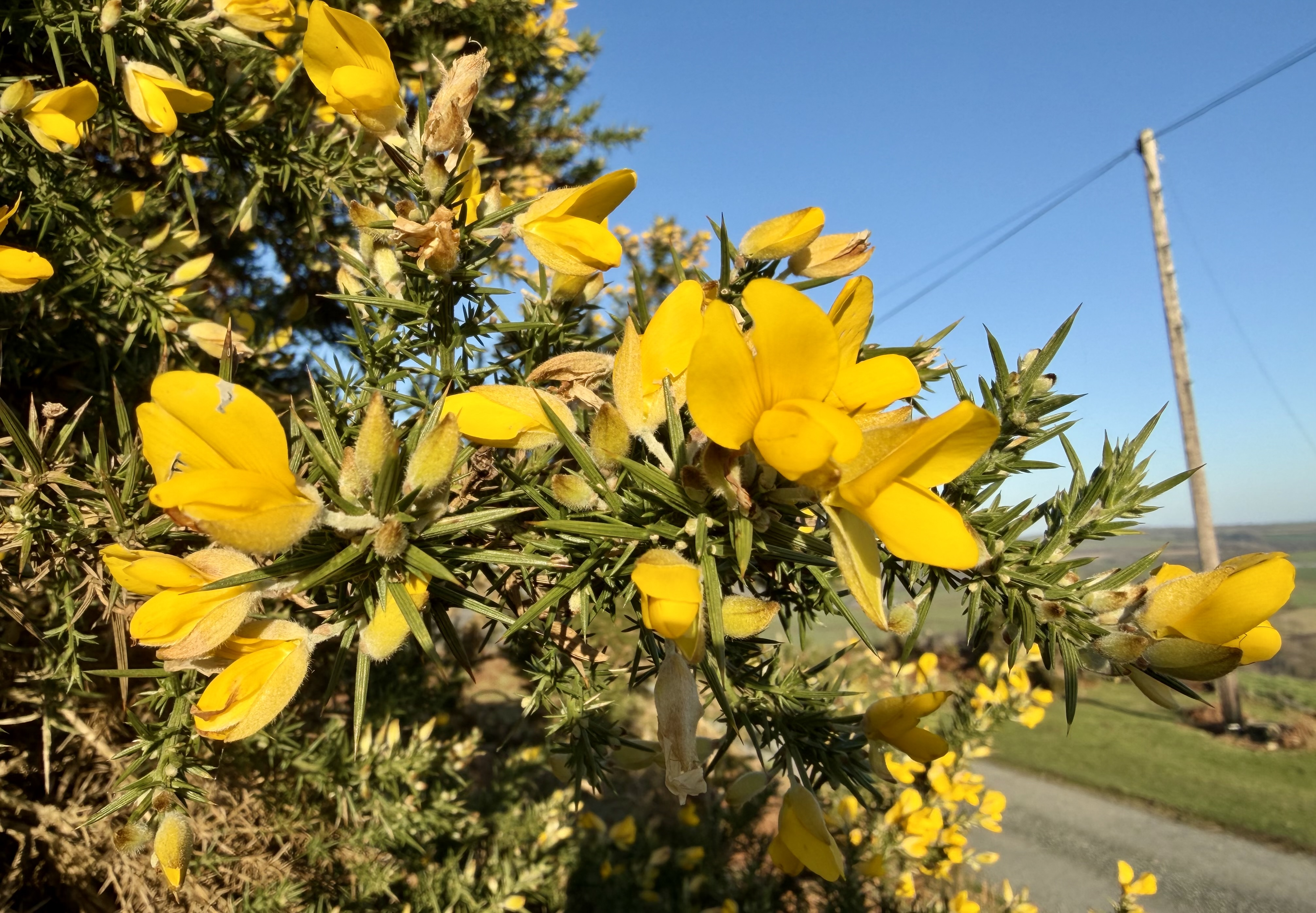

Conservation status
- Least Concern (IUCN 3.1)

Scientific classification
- Kingdom: Plantae
- Clade: Tracheophytes
- Clade: Angiosperms
- Clade: Eudicots
- Clade: Rosids
- Order: Fabales
- Family: Fabaceae
- Subfamily: Faboideae
- Genus: Ulex
- Species: U. europaeus

Binomial name
- Ulex europaeus L.

= Ulex europaeus =

Species of flowering plant in the bean family

Ulex europaeus, commonly known as gorse, common gorse, furze or whin, is a species of flowering plant native to Western Europe.

== Description ==
Growing to 4.5 metres (10 ft) tall, it is an evergreen shrub. The young stems are green, with the shoots and leaves modified into green spines, 1–3 centimetres (1/2–1 1/4 in) long. Young seedlings produce normal leaves for the first few months; these are trifoliate, resembling a small clover leaf.

The solitary flowers are yellow, 1–2 cm (1/2–3/4 in) long, with the pea-flower structure typical of the Fabaceae; they are produced throughout the year, but mainly over a long period in spring. They are coconut-scented. The fruit is a legume (pod) 2 cm (3/4 in) long, dark purplish-brown, partly enclosed by the pale brown remnants of the flower; the pod contains 2–3 small blackish, shiny, hard seeds, which are ejected when the pod splits open in hot weather. Seeds remain viable for 30 years.

Like many species of gorse, it readily catches fire due to high levels of natural oils found in the spines. However, the plant can resprout from anywhere on the stem above the roots and the seeds remain viable after fire, so gorse can grow in recently burned areas.

It has a tap root, lateral and adventitious roots. An extremely tough and hardy plant, it survives temperatures down to −20 °C (−4 °F). It can live for about thirty years.

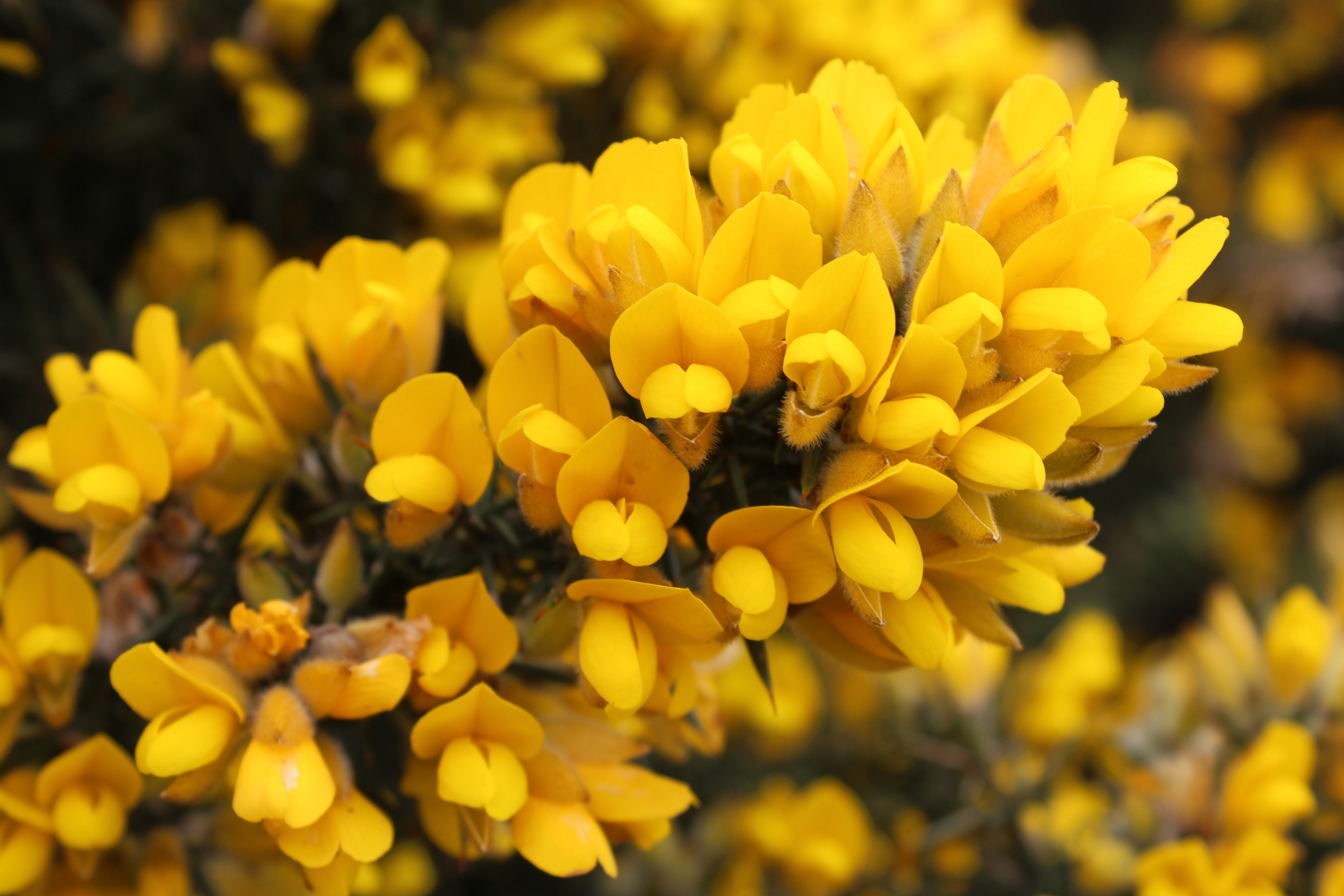
Flowers

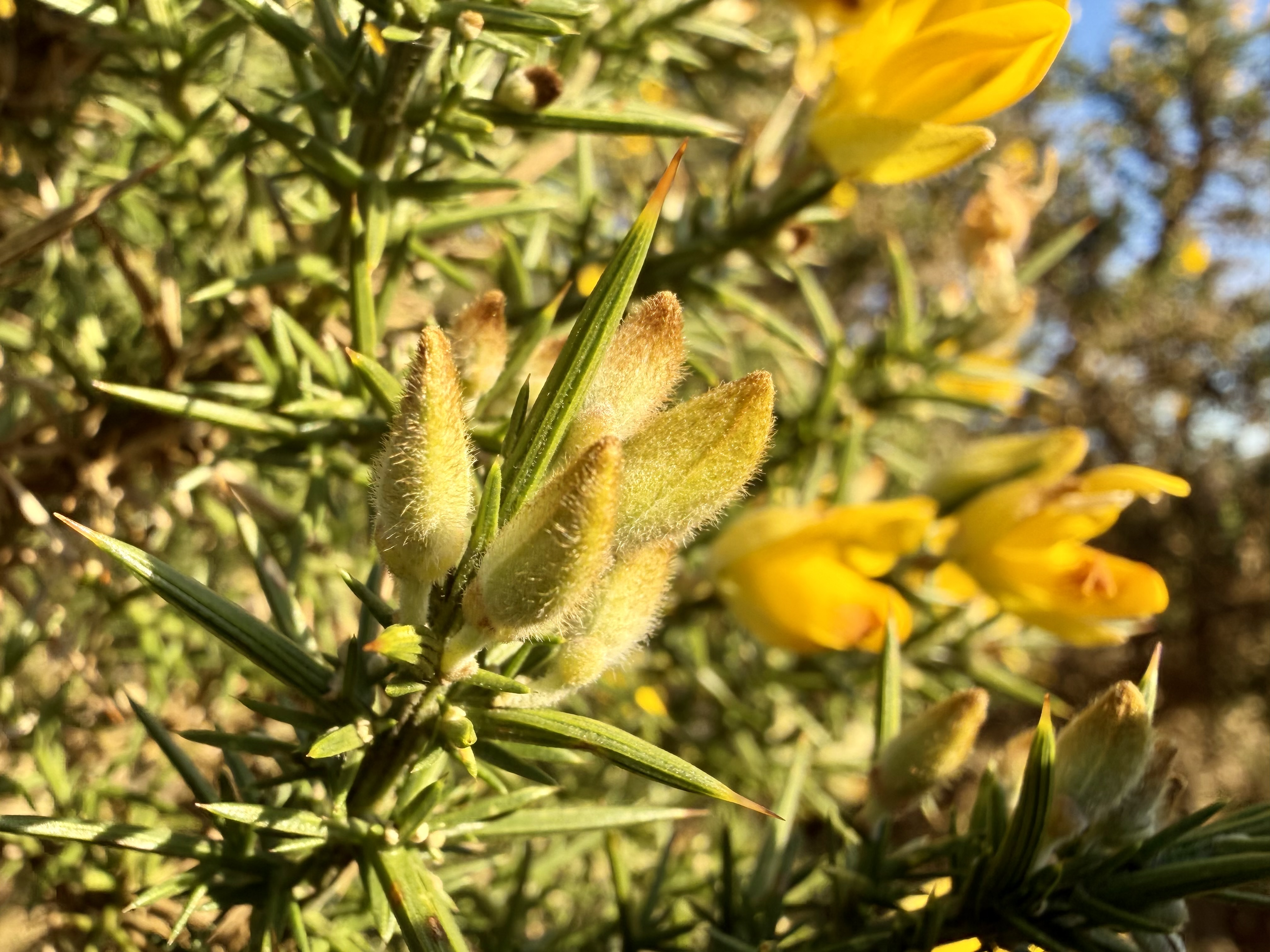
Buds

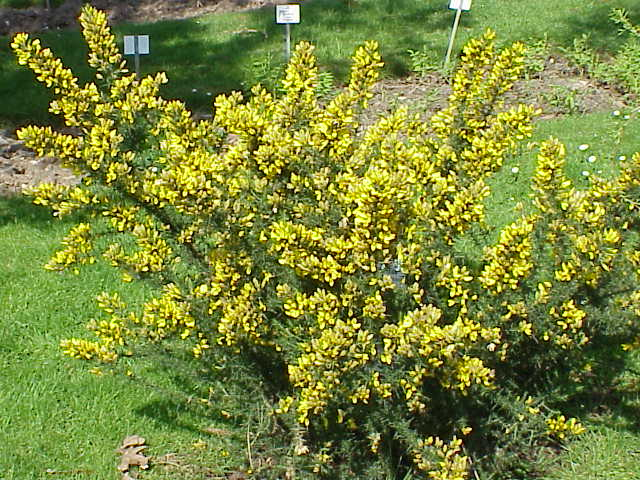
A shrub

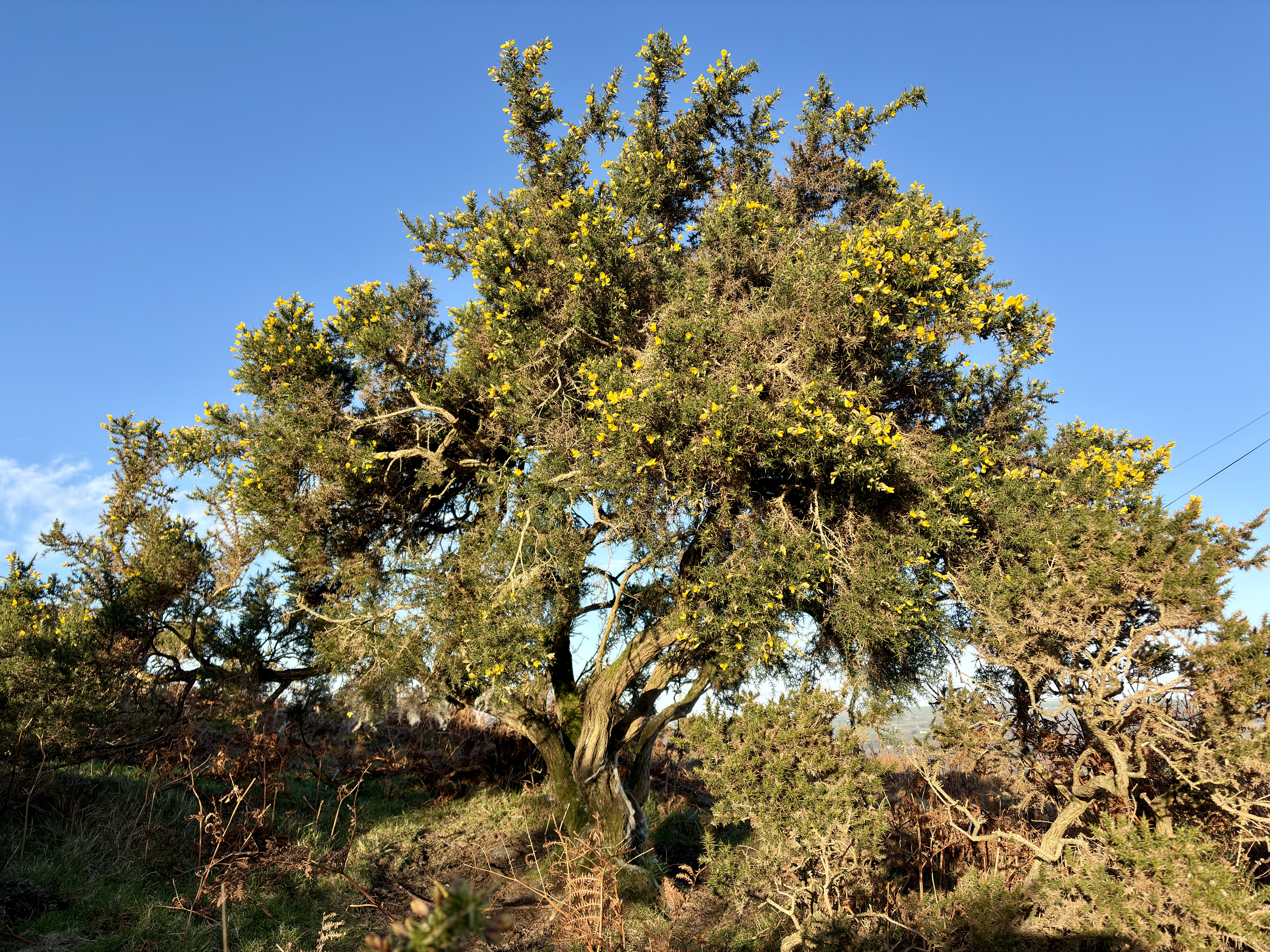
A tall shrub

== Ecology ==
Like other legumes, it fixes nitrogen into the soil.

=== As an invasive species ===
The species has been introduced to other areas of Europe, and also to the Americas, New Zealand, South Africa, and Australia, where it is often considered a weed and is a serious problem invasive species in some areas (notably the western United States, Chile and New Zealand). It was introduced to New Zealand from Britain as a type of hedge, but became a major blight to farmers as the climate suited its growth better than its native habitat and many of its natural predators were absent.

Common gorse is also an invasive species in the montane grasslands of Horton Plains National Park in Sri Lanka. It outcompetes native, endemic species and is a fire hazard.

Biological pest control is used on this plant in many areas. The gorse spider mite (Tetranychus lintearius) and the gorse seed weevil (Exapion ulicis) reduce the spread of the plant, although their efficacy has varied.

== Cultivation ==
This plant is used for hedging, boundary definition and groundcover in suitably sunny, open locations. Cultivars include 'Strictus' (Irish gorse), a dwarf form, and the double-flowered, non-fruiting 'Flore Pleno', which has gained the Royal Horticultural Society's Award of Garden Merit.

== Uses ==
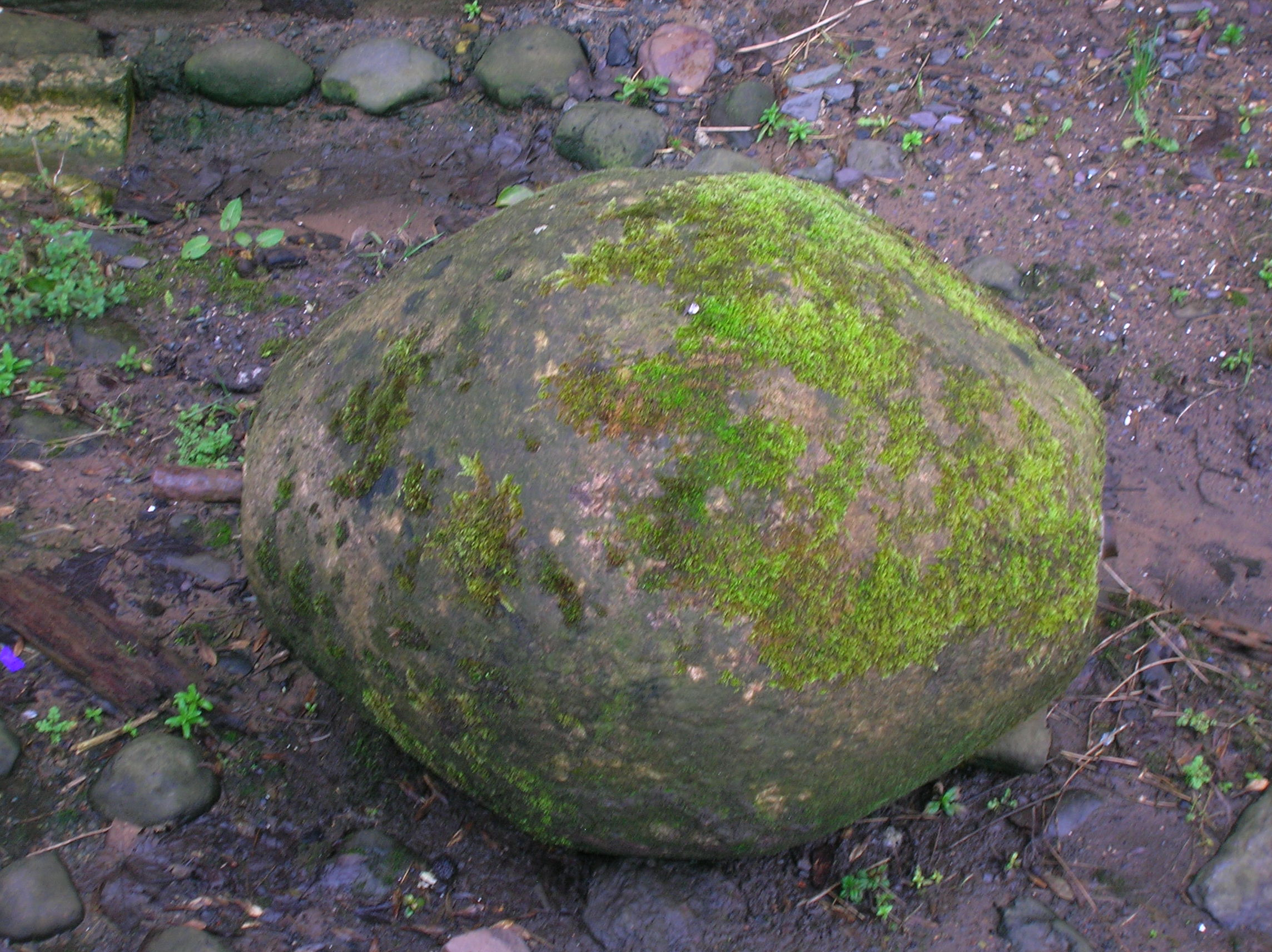
Whin-stone, used for bruising gorse

Bruised gorse was used in some areas for feeding to horses and other livestock. The fragrant petals have a number of culinary uses.

A lectin extracted from seeds of this species binds to, is remarkably specific for, and is the standard method for identification of H substance (absent in the hh antigen system) on human red blood cells. The vast majority of humans express H substance, which is the basis for the ABO blood group system, but a few rare individuals ("Bombay phenotype") do not—and a chemical isolated from U. europaeus is used to identify these individuals. This lectin is also used as a marker for human vascular endothelial cells, and as a tool for their isolation for in vitro culture.

== See also ==
- Gorse in New Zealand
