= Cis AB =

Type of rare mutation in the ABO gene

Regular (trans) AB versus cis AB

Inheritance of regular ABO for AB and O parents

Cis AB inheritance, scenario 1.1: in the AB parent, one allele is AB and other is O

Cis AB is a type of rare mutation in the ABO gene. It happens when the transferase allele contains a mix of amino acids from either A or B alleles, producing a bifunctional enzyme that can produce both types of antigens, usually with one weaker than the other. This results in a serum test result much like the standard, separate (trans) AB phenotype, although the weaker antigen can occasionally fail to be detected. It complicates the basic inheritance pattern (as the allele comes from one parent only) and blood-transfusion compatibility matching for ABO blood typing.

Different DNA mutations of either type A or Type B alleles change amino acids in enzyme transferase A or B, homologous enzymes differing in only four of 354 amino acids (R176G, G235S, L266M, and G268A). A single change in ABO gene DNA could switch type B to type A and then, a new hybrid enzyme can produce both weak B and A2 (in serum test, A2B, and A2B3). The most common mutation is an A105 allele variation in exon 7 nucleotide position G803C changing glycine (type A) to alanine (type B). Another 8 alleles are reported in BGMUT, most recently in China and Taiwan. Some Cis-AB carriers need components like washed red blood cells or autotransfusion of serum and blood.

Cis-AB type was studied first in humans in Japan (Shikoku Island) and South Korea (Gwangju area) where this rare type is more common (Chinese coast provinces and Taiwan also), although it is seen in a few European families (from France, Spain, Belgium, Germany, and Poland). In the year 2004, the American Red Cross described a family in Nebraska with a father of type cis-AB negative, a mother type O and their baby of type cis-AB. Since then, several cases in the United States have been reported. Antigen expression is weaker than A1 or B.

== Scenarios ==
When one parent carries a Cis AB allele, the other allele can be any of O, A or B. The phenotype of this parent is always AB, but the children will inherit either the AB or the other allele from this parent.

1. If the other parent is O phenotype (OO genotype) the three possible scenarios for the blood group of children of a Cis AB carrier (and a fourth unlikely scenario) are:
  1. The second allele is O: children are either AB or O
  2. Second allele is A: Children are either AB or A
  3. Second allele is B: Children are either AB or B
  4. A very rare 4th possibility exists: if the other allele is also Cis AB then the children will be always AB irrespective whatever the other parent is, because they will have one cis AB allele from this parent.
2. If the other parent is type A, depending on whether this parent is genotypically AA or AO and what the other allele is in the Cis Ab carrying parent, the following scenarios are possible:
  1. Other parent is AO and the second allele is O: The children are either AB or A or O
  2. Other parent is AA and the second allele is O: The children are either AB or A
  3. Other parent is AO and the second allele is A: The children are either AB or A
  4. Other parent is AA and the second allele is A: The children are either AB or A
  5. Other parent is AO and the second allele is B: The children are either AB or B
  6. Other parent is AA and the second allele is B: The children are always AB
  7. Rare situation: If the other allele is also cis AB: The children are always AB
3. Likewise, similar scenarios for the other parent being type B are:
  1. Other parent is BO and the second allele is O: The children are either AB or B or O
  2. Other parent is BO and the second allele is A: The children are either AB or A
  3. Other parent is BO and the second allele is B: The children are always AB or B
  4. Other parent is BB and the second allele is B: The children are either AB or B
  5. Other parent is BB and the second allele is O: The children are either AB or B
  6. Other parent is BB and the second allele is A: The children are always AB
  7. Rare situation: If the other allele is also cis AB: The children are always AB

ABO inheritance is generally derived assuming the children are not the rare Bombay phenotype, which would require both parents to be carriers of it.

== Real life implications ==
=== Maternity and paternity disputes ===
When testing paternity or maternity by ABO blood group alone, it is possible to have a paradoxical result in the rare instance that a cis-AB genotype is involved. For example, (scenario 1.1 above) a child of a cis AB individual (who will test as a regular AB phenotype) and an O individual will be either AB or O instead of the usual A or B (see diagram above).

=== Differential diagnosis ===
If the child of an AB and an O individual is O (the green-colored offspring in the scenario 1 image above), then a rare alternative possibility is that the parents were carriers (heterozygous) for the Bombay phenotype (Hh) and the child is a Bombay (hh) homozygous by genotype thus expressing Bombay phenotype also called O_{h} where, despite the presence of the ABO alleles, the substrate from which those antigens are made is not made and thus A, B and even O antigen are not expressed at all and are completely absent from the red cells.
