= 001 =

001, O01, or OO1 may refer to:

== Arts and entertainment ==
- 001, fictional British agent; see 00 Agent
- 001, also known as the Princess of Klaxosaurs, is a character and the central antagonist from DARLING in the FRANXX
- 001, a character in the 2016 Canadian Netflix science fiction series Travelers
  - "001", an episode of the series' second season
- Player number of Oh Il-nam and Oh Young-il, characters in the South Korean drama Squid Game
  - "001" (Squid Game episode), 2024 episode of Squid Game
- Subject designation number of Henry Creel, also known as Vecna or Mr. Whatsit, the main antagonist of the American science fiction horror series Stranger Things

== Transportation ==
- AM-RB 001, the code-name for the Aston Martin Valkyrie sports car
- Zeekr 001, an electric shooting brake produced by Geely
- O01 Heussler Hamburg Heliport; see list of airports in New York

== Science ==
- 1992 OO1, the asteroid 10111 Fresnel
- 1997 OO1, the asteroid 9987 Peano
- O01, an allele; see ABO

== Other uses ==
- 1 (number), a numeral
- 001, former emergency telephone number for the Norwegian fire brigade (until 1986)
- Code for the world in the UN M49 standard for area codes
- Tyrrell 001, a Formula One racing car
