= FUT2 =

Protein and coding gene in humans

Identifiers
- Aliases: FUT2, B12QTL1, SE, SEC2, Se2, sej, fucosyltransferase 2
- External IDs: OMIM: 182100; MGI: 109374; GeneCards: FUT2
Enzyme activity
EC #	BRENDA	ExPASy	KEGG	MetaCyc
2.4.1.69	↗	↗	↗	↗
2.4.1.344	↗	↗	↗	↗

Gene location (Human)
Chr.	Chromosome 19 (human)
Band	19q13.33	Start	48,695,971 bp
Band	19q13.33	End	48,705,951 bp

Gene location (Mouse)
Chr.	Chromosome 7 (mouse)
Band	7 B3|7 29.41 cM	Start	45,298,015 bp
Band	7 B3|7 29.41 cM	End	45,315,818 bp
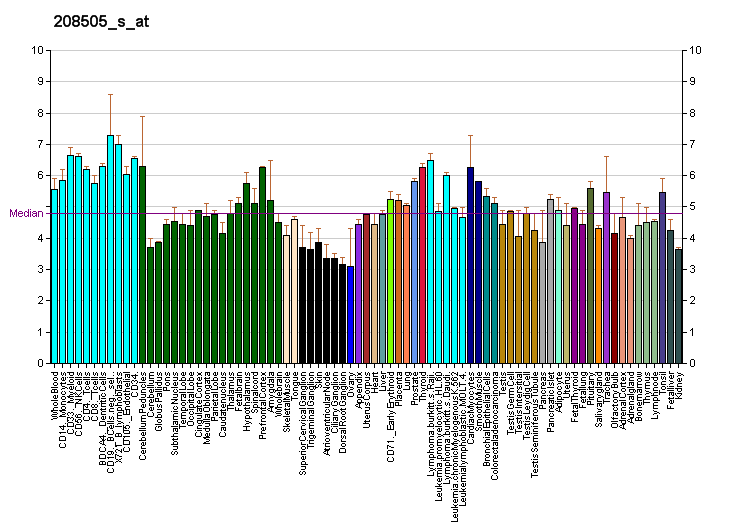

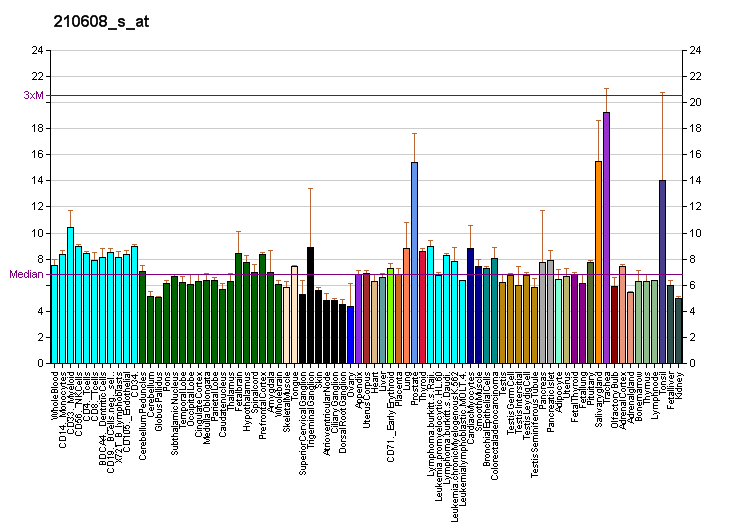
RNA expression pattern
Bgee	Human / Mouse (ortholog); Top expressed in: olfactory zone of nasal mucosa; nasal epithelium; minor salivary glands; pancreatic ductal cell; mucosa of transverse colon; buccal mucosa cell; duodenum; oral cavity; rectum; palpebral conjunctiva / Top expressed in: lip; left colon; epithelium of stomach; skin of external ear; seminal vesicula; duodenum; esophagus; migratory enteric neural crest cell; skin of back; lobe of prostate; More reference expression data
BioGPS	More reference expression data
Gene ontology
Molecular function	transferase activity; galactoside 2-alpha-L-fucosyltransferase activity; glycosyltransferase activity; fucosyltransferase activity
Cellular component	integral component of membrane; Golgi cisterna membrane; Golgi apparatus; extracellular exosome; membrane
Biological process	protein glycosylation; L-fucose catabolic process; fucosylation; carbohydrate metabolic process
Sources:Amigo / QuickGO
Orthologs
Databases	NCBI: entry; OMA: entry
Species	Human	Mouse
Entrez	2524	14344
Ensembl	ENSG00000176920	ENSMUSG00000055978
UniProt	Q10981	Q9JL27
RefSeq (mRNA)	NM_001097638; NM_000511	NM_001271993; NM_018876
RefSeq (protein)	NP_000502; NP_001091107	NP_001258922; NP_061364
Location (UCSC)	Chr 19: 48.7 – 48.71 Mb	Chr 7: 45.3 – 45.32 Mb
PubMed search
- Wikidata
View/Edit Human	View/Edit Mouse

Galactoside 2-alpha-L-fucosyltransferase 2 is an enzyme that in humans is encoded by the FUT2 (fucosyltransferase 2) gene.

FUT2 is a key enzyme that catalyzes the transfer of L-fucose from guanosine diphosphate-beta-L-fucose to the terminal galactose on both O- and N-linked glycans of cell surface glycoproteins and glycolipids. This enzymatic activity is essential for the synthesis of the H antigen, a precursor required for the formation of ABO blood group antigens, and determines "secretor status"—the presence of blood group antigens in bodily fluids such as saliva. Beyond its role in blood group antigen synthesis, FUT2 influences cell-cell interactions, modulates the composition of the gut microbiome, and impacts susceptibility to infections and autoimmune diseases, highlighting its broad significance in human health and disease.

Approximately 20% of Caucasians are non-secretors due to the G428A (rs601338) and C571T (rs492602?) nonsense mutations in FUT2 and therefore have strong although not absolute protection from the norovirus GII.4.

== Role in secretor status ==
The FUT2 gene determines an individual's secretor status by encoding an enzyme responsible for the expression of histo-blood group antigens in bodily secretions. Approximately 70–80% of people are secretors, meaning they possess at least one functional FUT2 allele. Those who are homozygous for a nonfunctional allele are termed non-secretors, which has important health implications.

== Clinical significance ==
Non-secretors display altered susceptibility to both infectious and autoimmune diseases. While they exhibit increased resistance to certain viral pathogens like norovirus, they are more prone to developing chronic inflammatory conditions such as Crohn's disease and type 1 diabetes.

=== Impact on the gut microbiome ===
Loss-of-function mutations in FUT2 dramatically alter the composition of the gut microbiome. Non-secretors have distinct microbial profiles compared to secretors, with studies reporting a reduction in Escherichia species and a rise in pro-inflammatory taxa. Notably, non-secretors also exhibit increased levels of butyrate-producing bacteria, which are generally considered beneficial.

=== Consequences for microbial metabolism ===
Although FUT2 does not directly regulate microbial metabolism, its influence on microbial community structure can indirectly affect metabolite production. The enrichment of butyrate producers in non-secretors may represent a compensatory mechanism, but this benefit may be insufficient to counterbalance the elevated inflammatory potential of the overall microbiome. Thus, FUT2 loss-of-function variants may skew the microbiome toward a pro-inflammatory state, potentially exacerbating conditions such as inflammatory bowel disease (IBD) and masking the protective effects of beneficial metabolites like butyrate.
