= Blood type =

Classification based on antibodies and antigens on RBC surfaces

Blood type (or blood group) is determined, in part, by the ABO blood group antigens present on red blood cells.

A blood type (also known as a blood group) is a classification of blood based on the presence and absence of antibodies and inherited antigenic substances on the surface of red blood cells (RBCs). These antigens may be proteins, carbohydrates, glycoproteins, or glycolipids, depending on the blood group. Some of these antigens are also present on the surface of other types of cells of various tissues. Several of these red blood cell surface antigens can stem from one allele (or an alternative version of a gene) and collectively form a blood group system.

Blood types are inherited and represent contributions from both parents of an individual. As of September 2026, a total of 49 human blood group systems are recognized by the International Society of Blood Transfusion (ISBT). The two most important blood group systems are ABO and Rh; they determine someone's blood type (A, B, AB, and O, with + or − denoting RhD status) for suitability in blood transfusion.

== Blood type systems ==
A complete blood type would describe each of the 49 blood groups, and an individual's blood type is one of many possible combinations of blood-group antigens. Almost always, an individual has the same blood group for life, but very rarely an individual's blood type changes through addition or suppression of an antigen in infection, malignancy, or autoimmune disease. Another more common cause of blood type change is a bone marrow transplant. Bone-marrow transplants are performed for many leukemias and lymphomas, among other diseases. If a person receives bone marrow from someone of a different ABO type (e.g., a type O patient receives a type A bone marrow), the patient's blood type should eventually become the donor's type, as the patient's hematopoietic stem cells (HSCs) are destroyed, either by ablation of the bone marrow or by the donor's T-cells. Once all the patient's original red blood cells have died, they will have been fully replaced by new cells derived from the donor HSCs. Provided the donor had a different ABO type, the new cells' surface antigens will be different from those on the surface of the patient's original red blood cells.

Some blood types are associated with the inheritance of other diseases; for example, the Kell antigen is sometimes associated with McLeod syndrome. Certain blood types may affect susceptibility to infections, such as the resistance to specific malaria species seen in individuals lacking the Duffy antigen. The Duffy antigen, presumably as a result of natural selection, is less common in population groups from areas having a high incidence of malaria.

=== ABO blood group system ===
ABO blood group system: diagram showing the carbohydrate chains that determine the ABO blood group

Simplified Punnett square of the possible genotypes and phenotypes of children given genotypes and phenotypes of their mother (rows) and father (columns) shaded by phenotype

The ABO blood group system involves two antigens and two antibodies found in human blood. The two antigens are antigen A and antigen B. The two antibodies are A and B. The antigens are present on the red blood cells, and the antibodies in the serum. Regarding the antigen property of the blood, all human beings can be classified into four groups: those with antigen A (group A), those with antigen B (group B), those with both antigen A and B (group AB), and those with neither antigen (group O). The antibodies present together with the antigens are found as follows:

1. Antigen A with antibody B
2. Antigen B with antibody A
3. Antigen AB with neither antibody A nor B
4. Antigen null (group O) with both antibodies A and B

There is an agglutination reaction between similar antigen and antibody (for example, antigen A agglutinates the antibody A, and antigen B agglutinates the antibody B). Thus, transfusion can be considered safe as long as the serum of the recipient does not contain antibodies for the blood cell antigens of the donor.

The ABO system is the most important blood-group system in human-blood transfusion. The associated anti-A and anti-B antibodies are usually immunoglobulin M, abbreviated IgM, antibodies. It has been hypothesized that ABO IgM antibodies are produced in the first years of life by sensitization to environmental substances such as food, bacteria, and viruses. The original terminology used by Karl Landsteiner in 1901 for the classification was A/B/C; in later publications "C" became "O". Type O is often called 0 (zero, or null) in other languages.

Phenotype and genotype of blood types
Phenotype	Alleles
A	ABO*A1.01
B	ABO*B1.01
AB	ABO*A1.01, ABO*B1.01
O	Two nonfunctional ABO genes

=== Rh blood group system ===
The Rh system (Rh meaning Rhesus) is the second most significant blood-group system in human blood transfusion, with currently 50 antigens. The most significant Rh antigen is the D antigen, because it is the most likely to provoke an immune system response of the five main Rh antigens. It is common for D-negative individuals not to have any anti-D IgG or IgM antibodies, because anti-D antibodies are not usually produced by sensitization against environmental substances. However, D-negative individuals can produce IgG anti-D antibodies following a sensitizing event: possibly a fetomaternal transfusion of blood from a fetus in pregnancy or occasionally a blood transfusion with D-positive RBCs. Rh negative blood types are much less common in Asian populations (0.3%) than they are in European populations (15%).

The presence or absence of the Rh(D) antigen is signified by the + or − sign, so that, for example, the A− group is ABO type A and does not have the Rh (D) antigen.

=== ABO and Rh distribution by country ===
As with many other genetic traits, the distribution of ABO and Rh blood groups varies significantly between populations. While theories are still debated in the scientific community as to why blood types vary geographically and why they emerged in the first place, evidence suggests that the evolution of blood types may be driven by genetic selection for those types whose antigens confer resistance to particular diseases in certain regions – such as the prevalence of blood type O in malaria-endemic countries where individuals of blood type O exhibit the highest rates of survival.

=== Other blood group systems ===
As of September 2026, 49 blood-group systems have been identified and are recognized by the International Society for Blood Transfusion. Thus, in addition to the ABO antigens and Rh antigens, many other antigens are expressed on the RBC surface membrane. For example, an individual can be AB, D positive, and at the same time M and N positive (MNS system), K positive (Kell system), Le^{a} or Le^{b} negative (Lewis system). Many of the blood group systems were named after the patients in whom the corresponding antibodies were initially encountered. Blood group systems other than ABO and Rh pose a potential, yet relatively low, risk of complications upon mixing of blood from different people.

The image illustrates the presence of the Rh factor across different blood types, examines the antigens associated with each ABO blood group, and shows which traits are dominant and recessive.

Following is a comparison of clinically relevant characteristics of antibodies against the main human blood group systems:

	ABO	Rh	Kell	Duffy	Kidd
Naturally occurring	Yes	No	No	No	No
Most common in immediate hemolytic transfusion reactions	A		Yes	Fy^{a}	Jk^{a}
Most common in delayed hemolytic transfusion reactions		E, D, C			Jk^{a}
Most common in hemolytic disease of the newborn	Yes	D, C	Yes		
Commonly produce intravascular hemolysis	Yes				Yes

== Clinical significance ==
=== Blood transfusion ===
Transfusion medicine is a specialized branch of hematology that is concerned with the study of blood groups, along with the work of a blood bank that provides a transfusion service with blood and other blood products. Across the world, blood products must be prescribed by a medical doctor (licensed physician or surgeon) in a similar way as medicines.

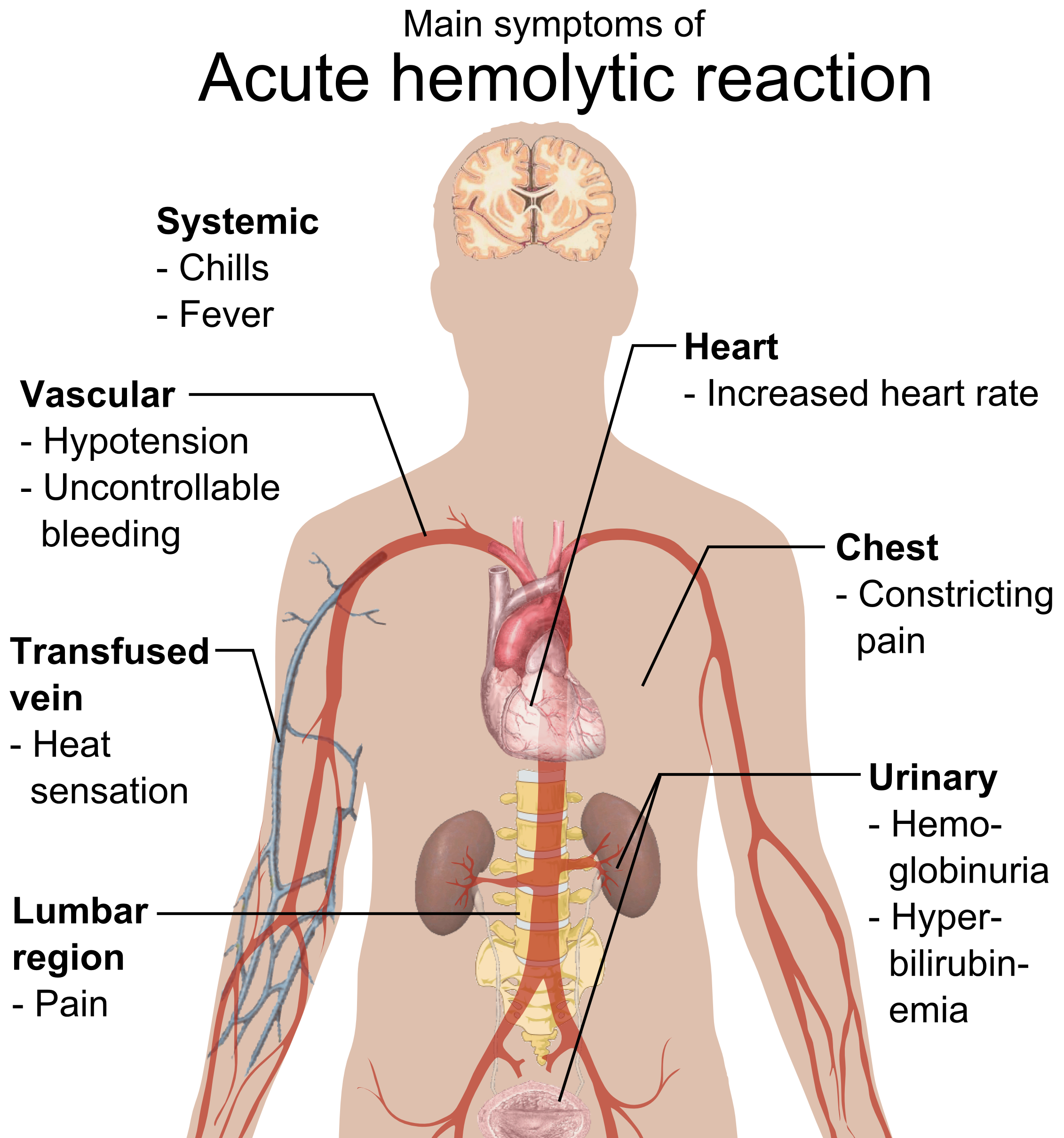
Main symptoms of acute hemolytic reaction due to blood type mismatch.

Much of the routine work of a blood bank involves testing blood from both donors and recipients to ensure that every individual recipient is given blood that is compatible and as safe as possible. If a unit of incompatible blood is transfused between a donor and recipient, a severe acute hemolytic reaction with hemolysis (RBC destruction), kidney failure and shock is likely to occur, and death is a possibility. Antibodies can be highly active and can attack RBCs and bind components of the complement system to cause massive hemolysis of the transfused blood.

Patients should ideally receive their own blood or type-specific blood products to minimize the chance of a transfusion reaction. It is also possible to use the patient's own blood for transfusion. This is called autologous blood transfusion, which is always compatible with the patient. The procedure of washing a patient's own red blood cells goes as follows: The patient's lost blood is collected and washed with a saline solution. The washing procedure yields concentrated washed red blood cells. The last step is reinfusing the packed red blood cells into the patient. There are multiple ways to wash red blood cells. The two main ways are centrifugation and filtration methods. This procedure can be performed with microfiltration devices. Risks can be further reduced by cross-matching blood, but this may be skipped when blood is required for an emergency. The oldest form of cross-matching involves mixing a sample of the recipient's serum with a sample of the donor's red blood cells and checking if the mixture agglutinates or forms clumps. If agglutination is not obvious by direct vision, a blood bank technologist may check for agglutination with a microscope. If agglutination occurs, that donor's blood cannot be transfused to that particular recipient. In a bank transfusion service, all blood specimens must be correctly identified, so labelling has been standardized using a barcode system known as ISBT 128.

The blood group may be included on identification tags or historically on tattoos worn by military personnel, in case they should need an emergency blood transfusion. Frontline German Waffen-SS had blood group tattoos during World War II.

Rare blood types can cause supply problems for blood banks and hospitals. For example, Duffy-negative blood occurs much more frequently in people of African origin, and the rarity of this blood type in the rest of the population can result in a shortage of Duffy-negative blood for these patients. Similarly, for RhD negative people there is a risk associated with travelling to parts of the world where supplies of RhD-negative blood are rare, particularly East Asia, where blood services may endeavour to encourage Westerners to donate blood.

=== Hemolytic disease of the newborn (HDN) ===
A pregnant woman may carry a fetus with a blood type that is different from her own. Typically, this is an issue if a RhD negative mother has a child with a RhD positive father, and the fetus ends up being Rh positive. In those cases, the mother can make IgG blood group antibodies. This can happen if some of the fetus's blood cells pass into the mother's blood circulation (e.g., a small fetomaternal hemorrhage at the time of childbirth or obstetric intervention), or sometimes after a therapeutic blood transfusion. This can cause hemolytic disease of the newborn (HDN) in the current pregnancy or subsequent pregnancies. Sometimes this is lethal for the fetus; in these cases it is called hydrops fetalis. If a pregnant woman is known to have anti-D antibodies, the RhD blood type of a fetus can be tested by analysis of fetal DNA in maternal plasma to assess the risk to the fetus of Rh disease. Cell-free DNA testing can determine the fetal RHD genotype in a sample of maternal plasma after 10 weeks of gestation. One of the major advances of twentieth-century medicine was to prevent this disease by stopping the formation of anti-D antibodies by D-negative mothers with an injectable medication called Rho(D) immune globulin. Antibodies associated with some blood groups can cause severe HDN, others can only cause mild HDN and others are not known to cause HDN.

=== Blood products ===
To provide maximum benefit from each blood donation and to extend shelf-life, blood banks fractionate some whole blood into several products. The most common of these products are RBCs, plasma, platelets, cryoprecipitate, and fresh frozen plasma (FFP). FFP is quick-frozen to retain the labile clotting factors V and VIII, which are usually administered to patients who have a potentially fatal clotting problem caused by a condition such as advanced liver disease, overdose of anticoagulant, or disseminated intravascular coagulation (DIC).

Units of packed red cells are made by removing as much of the plasma as possible from whole blood units.

Clotting factors synthesized by modern recombinant methods are now in routine clinical use for hemophilia, as the risks of infection transmission that occur with pooled blood products are avoided.

=== Red blood cell compatibility ===
- Blood group AB individuals have both A and B antigens on the surface of their RBCs, and their blood plasma does not contain any antibodies against either A or B antigen. Therefore, an individual with type AB blood can receive blood from any group (with AB being preferable), but cannot donate blood to any group other than AB. They are known as universal recipients.
- Blood group A individuals have the A antigen on the surface of their RBCs, and blood serum containing IgM antibodies against the B antigen. Therefore, a group A individual can receive blood only from individuals of groups A or O (with A being preferable), and can donate blood to individuals with type A or AB.
- Blood group B individuals have the B antigen on the surface of their RBCs, and blood serum containing IgM antibodies against the A antigen. Therefore, a group B individual can receive blood only from individuals of groups B or O (with B being preferable), and can donate blood to individuals with type B or AB.
- Blood group O individuals have no A or B antigens on the surface of their RBCs, and their blood serum contains IgM anti-A and anti-B antibodies. Therefore, a group O individual can receive blood only from a group O individual, but can donate blood to individuals of any ABO blood group (i.e., A, B, O or AB). If a patient needs an urgent blood transfusion, and if the time taken to process the recipient's blood would cause a detrimental delay, O-negative blood can be used. Because it is compatible with anyone, there are some concerns that O-negative blood is often overused and consequently is always in short supply. According to the Association for the Advancement of Blood and Biotherapies (AABB) and the British Chief Medical Officer's National Blood Transfusion Committee, the use of group O RhD negative red cells should be restricted to persons with O negative blood, women who might be pregnant, and emergency cases in which blood-group testing is genuinely impracticable.

Red blood cell compatibility chart In addition to donating to the same blood group, type O blood donors can give to A, B, and AB; blood donors of types A and B can give to AB.

Red blood cell compatibility table
Donor^{[1]} Recipient	O−	O+	A−	A+	B−	B+	AB−	AB+
O−	✓	✗	✗	✗	✗	✗	✗	✗
O+	✓	✓	✗	✗	✗	✗	✗	✗
A−	✓	✗	✓	✗	✗	✗	✗	✗
A+	✓	✓	✓	✓	✗	✗	✗	✗
B−	✓	✗	✗	✗	✓	✗	✗	✗
B+	✓	✓	✗	✗	✓	✓	✗	✗
AB−	✓	✗	✓	✗	✓	✗	✓	✗
AB+	✓	✓	✓	✓	✓	✓	✓	✓

Table note
1. Assumes absence of atypical antibodies that would cause an incompatibility between donor and recipient blood, as is usual for blood selected by cross matching.

An Rh D-negative patient who does not have any anti-D antibodies (never been previously sensitized to D-positive RBCs) can receive a transfusion of D-positive blood, but this may cause sensitization to the D antigen, and a female patient could become at risk for hemolytic disease of the newborn. If a D-negative patient has developed anti-D antibodies, a subsequent exposure to D-positive blood could lead to a potentially dangerous transfusion reaction. Rh D-positive blood should never be given to D-negative women of childbearing age or to patients with D antibodies, so blood banks must conserve Rh-negative blood for these patients. In extreme circumstances, such as for a major bleed when stocks of D-negative blood units are very low at the blood bank, D-positive blood might be given to D-negative females above childbearing age or to Rh-negative males, provided that they did not have anti-D antibodies, to conserve D-negative inventory in the blood bank. The converse is not true; Rh D-positive patients do not react to D-negative blood.

This same matching is done for other antigens of the Rh system as C, c, E, and e, and for other blood group systems with a known risk for alloimmunization, such as the Kell system, particularly for chronically transfused patients.

=== Plasma compatibility ===
Plasma compatibility chart In addition to donating to the same blood group, plasma from type AB can be given to A, B, and O; plasma from types A, B, and AB can be given to O.

Blood plasma compatibility is the inverse of red blood cell compatibility. Type AB plasma carries neither anti-A nor anti-B antibodies and can be transfused to individuals of any blood group; but type AB patients can only receive type AB plasma. Type O carries both antibodies, so individuals of blood group O can receive plasma from any blood group, but type O plasma can be used only by type O recipients.

Plasma compatibility table
Donor Recipient	O	A	B	AB
O	✓	✓	✓	✓
A	✗	✓	✗	✓
B	✗	✗	✓	✓
AB	✗	✗	✗	✓

Table note
1. Assuming the absence of strong atypical antibodies in donor plasma

=== Universal donors and universal recipients ===
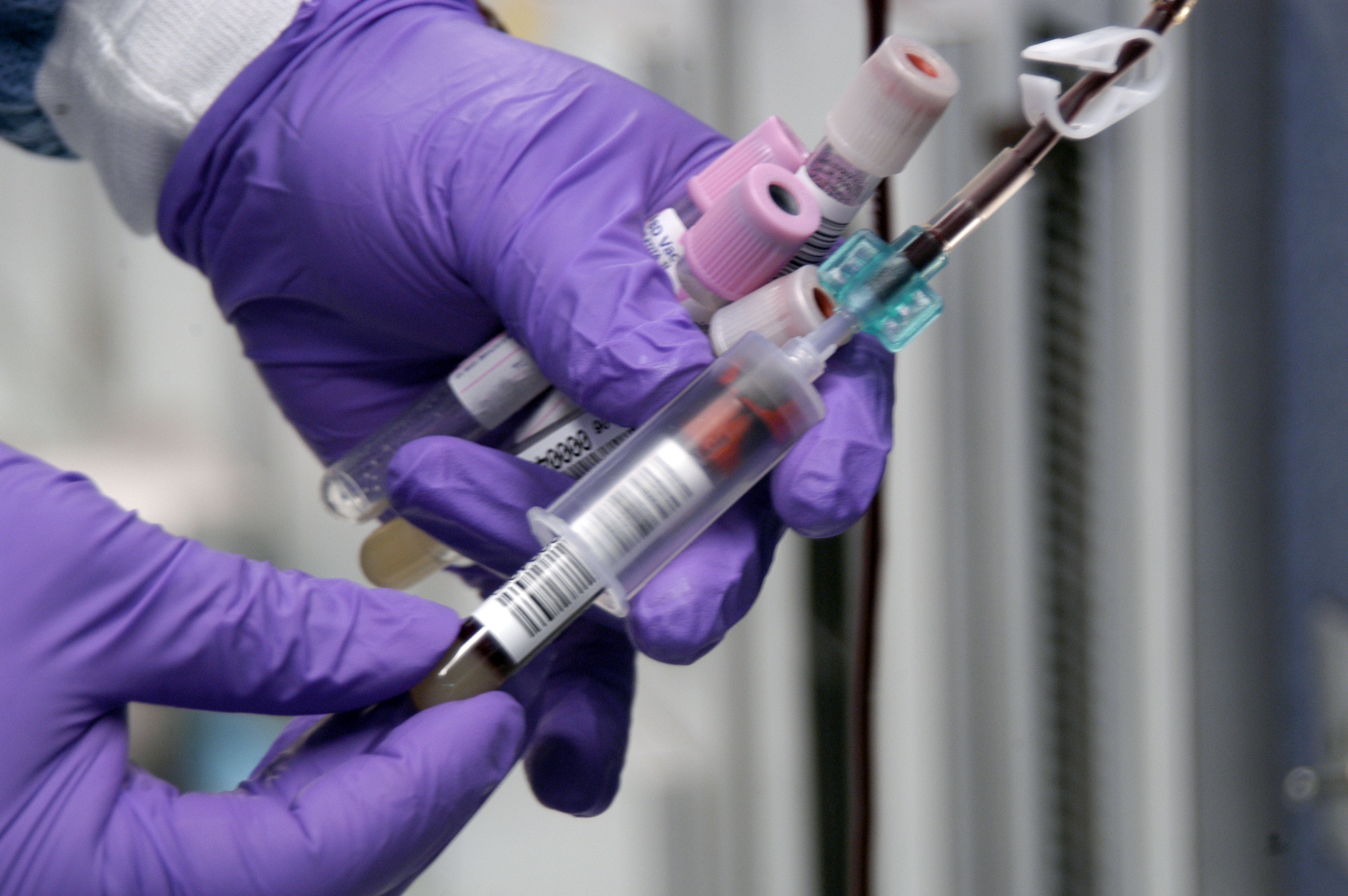
A hospital worker takes samples of blood from a donor for testing

In transfusions of red blood cells, individuals with type O Rh D-negative blood are often called universal donors. Those with type AB Rh D-positive blood are called universal recipients. However, these terms are only generally true with respect to possible reactions of the recipient's anti-A and anti-B antibodies to transfused red blood cells, and also possible sensitization to Rh D antigens. One exception is individuals with hh antigen system (also known as the Bombay phenotype) who can only receive blood safely from other hh donors, because they form antibodies against the H antigen present on all red blood cells.

Blood donors with exceptionally strong anti-A, anti-B, or any atypical blood group antibody may be excluded from blood donation of high plasma volume blood products. In general, while the plasma fraction of a blood transfusion may carry donor antibodies not found in the recipient, a significant reaction is unlikely because of dilution.

Additionally, red blood cell surface antigens other than A, B and Rh D might cause adverse reactions and sensitization, if they can bind to the corresponding antibodies to generate an immune response. Transfusions are further complicated because platelets and white blood cells (WBCs) have their own systems of surface antigens, and sensitization to platelet or WBC antigens can occur as a result of transfusion.

For transfusions of plasma, this situation is reversed. Type O plasma, containing both anti-A and anti-B antibodies, can only be given to O recipients. The antibodies will attack the antigens of any other blood type. Conversely, AB plasma can be given to patients of any ABO blood group, because it does not contain any anti-A or anti-B antibodies.

== Blood typing ==
Typically, blood type tests are performed by adding a blood sample to a solution containing antibodies corresponding to each antigen. The presence of an antigen on the surface of the blood cells is indicated by agglutination.

=== Blood group genotyping ===
In addition to the current practice of serologic testing of blood types, the progress in molecular diagnostics allows the increasing use of blood group genotyping, commonly known as red cell genotyping. In contrast to serologic tests reporting a direct blood type phenotype, genotyping allows the prediction of a phenotype based on the knowledge of the molecular basis of the currently known antigens. This allows a more detailed determination of the blood type and therefore a better match for transfusion, which can be crucial in particular for patients with needs for many transfusions to prevent alloimmunization.

== History ==
Blood types were first discovered by an Austrian physician, Karl Landsteiner, working at the Pathological-Anatomical Institute of the University of Vienna (now Medical University of Vienna). In 1900, he found that blood sera from different persons would clump together (agglutinate) when mixed in test tubes, and not only that, some human blood also agglutinated with animal blood. He wrote a two-sentence footnote:

The serum of healthy human beings not only agglutinates animal red cells, but also often those of human origin, from other individuals. It remains to be seen whether this appearance is related to inborn differences between individuals or is the result of some damage of a bacterial kind.

This was the first evidence that blood variation exists in humans. The next year, in 1901, he made a definitive observation that the blood serum of an individual would agglutinate with only those of certain individuals. Based on this, he classified human blood into three groups, namely group A, group B, and group C. He defined that group A blood agglutinates with group B, but never with its own type. Similarly, group B blood agglutinates with group A. Group C blood is different in that it agglutinates with both A and B. This was the discovery of blood groups for which Landsteiner was awarded the Nobel Prize in Physiology or Medicine in 1930. (C was later renamed to O after the German Ohne, meaning without, or zero, or null.) Another group (later named AB) was discovered a year later by Landsteiner's students Adriano Sturli and Alfred von Decastello without designating the name (simply referring it to as "no particular type"). Thus, after Landsteiner, three blood types were initially recognised, namely A, B, and C.

Czech serologist Jan Janský was the first to recognise and designate four blood types in 1907 that he published in a local journal, using the Roman numerical I, II, III, and IV (corresponding to modern O, A, B, and AB respectively). Unknown to Janský, American physician William L. Moss introduced an almost identical classification in 1910, but with Moss's I and IV corresponding to Janský's IV and I. Thus the existence of two systems immediately created confusion and potential danger in medical practice. Moss's system was adopted in Britain, France, and the US, while Janský's was preferred in most other European countries and some parts of the US. It was reported that "The practically universal use of the Moss classification at that time was completely and purposely cast aside. Therefore, in place of bringing order out of chaos, chaos was increased in the larger cities." To resolve the confusion, the American Association of Immunologists, the Society of American Bacteriologists, and the Association of Pathologists and Bacteriologists made a joint recommendation in 1921 that the Jansky classification be adopted based on priority. But it was not followed particularly where Moss's system had been used.

In 1927, Landsteiner, who had moved to the Rockefeller Institute for Medical Research in New York, and as a member of a committee of the National Research Council concerned with blood grouping suggested to substitute Janský's and Moss's systems with the letters O, A, B, and AB. There was another confusion on the use of O, which was introduced by Polish physician Ludwik Hirszfeld and German physician Emil von Dungern in 1910. It was never clear whether it was meant for the figure 0, German null for zero or the upper case letter O for ohne, meaning without; Landsteiner chose the letter.

In 1928 the Permanent Commission on Biological Standardization adopted Landsteiner's proposal and stated:

The Commission learns with satisfaction that, on the initiative of the Health Organization of the League of Nations, the nomenclature proposed by von Dungern and Hirszfeld for the classification of blood groups has been generally accepted, and recommends that this nomenclature shall be adopted for international use as follows: 0 A B AB. To facilitate the change from the nomenclature hitherto employed, the following is suggested:

- Jansky ....O(I) A(II) B(III) AB(IV)
- Moss ... O(IV) A(II) B(III) AB(I)

This classification became widely accepted and after the early 1950s it was universally followed.

Hirszfeld and Dungern discovered the inheritance of blood types as Mendelian genetics in 1910 and the existence of sub-types of A in 1911. In 1927, Landsteiner, with Philip Levine, discovered the MN blood group system, and the P system. Development of the Coombs test in 1945, the advent of transfusion medicine, and the understanding of ABO hemolytic disease of the newborn led to discovery of more blood groups. As of September 2026, the International Society of Blood Transfusion (ISBT) recognizes 49 blood groups.

== Society and culture ==
=== As folk personality typology ===
A popular pseudoscientific belief in Eastern Asian countries (especially in Japan and South Korea) is that a person's ABO blood type is predictive of their personality, character, and compatibility with others. Researchers have established no scientific basis exists for blood type personality categorization, and studies have found no "significant relationship between personality and blood type, rendering the theory 'obsolete' and concluding that no basis exists to assume that personality is anything more than randomly associated with blood type."

=== Computer encoding ===
The Unicode Consortium has incorporated symbols for the ABO blood group system into the Universal Coded Character Set (🅰︎, 🅱︎, 🆎︎, and 🅾︎) and as emoji (🅰️, 🅱️, 🆎️, and 🅾️).

== See also ==
- Blood type (non-human)
- hh blood group
- Human leukocyte antigen
- Relationship between blood group and COVID-19
