= International Council for Commonality in Blood Banking Automation =

International Council for Commonality in Blood Banking Automation (ICCBBA) is an international not-for-profit non-governmental standards organization in official relations with the World Health Organization (WHO) and is responsible for management and development of the ISBT 128 Standard. It is based in Redlands, California, United States, and was incorporated as a nonprofit organization there in 2008. It was established in 1994.
