= Relationship between blood group and COVID-19 =

A series of studies have examined a potential relationship between blood group and COVID-19. Initial research conducted by scientists in Wuhan, China, on thousands of infected patients suggested that individuals with blood group A were more likely to experience severe symptoms of COVID-19 infection compared to those with blood group O. Other blood types fell between these two in terms of relative risk.

A second study, published in the New England Journal of Medicine, did not establish a causal relationship between blood type and the severity of COVID-19, but it did support the earlier findings from Chinese researchers. However, later studies conducted in other countries did not confirm a significant or meaningful link between blood type and disease severity, calling into question the universality of the initial findings.

== Scientific background ==
Due to the complex physical and chemical interactions between the virus and host cells, disease progression differs among individuals. Researchers have found that O-glycosylation, the attachment of carbohydrates to oxygen-containing groups on proteins, plays a key role in the development and spread of COVID-19. It is believed that a similar process may occur with O-glycoproteome, one of the important elements in the infection process.

== Research history ==
In the early days of the COVID-19 pandemic in China, researchers suggested that some blood groups might be more vulnerable to COVID-19 than others. Their findings showed that people with blood type A had the highest rate of hospitalization, whereas those with blood type O had the lowest.

By the next year, several studies had been published, which produced conflicting results. The differences were speculated to be due to possible, though unknown, differences in genetics, geography, or the prevalent viral variants in different studies. Large studies in the US and in Iran found no association between blood group and COVID-19 infection rates or severity. A 2020 review found an association between blood type and infection rates (estimated between 2% and 33% higher for type A) but no statistically significant difference in the risk of death.
