= Agglutinogen =

Antigen

Agglutinogen is an antigen that causes the formation of agglutinins in the body and leads to agglutination, such as hemagglutination, which involves red blood cells (RBCs).

The kind of agglutinogens present on the red blood cells helps determine the blood type of a person.

For example, in the ABO blood type classification system, if a person has blood type A, then the red blood cells exhibit agglutinogens A or antigens A. If the blood is of type B, the agglutinogens present are of type B. If the blood is of type AB, then both agglutinogens A and B are present. In blood type O, there are no agglutinogens on the surface of the red blood cells. The agglutinogens are made by specific enzymes, which are encoded in genes. Different versions, or alleles give rise to different agglutinogens: the A allele codes for an enzyme that makes the agglutinogen A and similarly the B allele results in the agglutinogen B. A third version of this gene, the O allele, codes for a protein that is not functional; it makes no surface molecules at all.

Everyone inherits two alleles of the gene, one from each parent. The combination of the two alleles determines the blood type.

The existence of agglutinogens on the surface of red blood cells has been inferred from the reactions, hemolysis and agglutination, which occur on contact with specific antisera.
