= BGMUT =

Content
- Description: database of variations in the genes that encode antigens of blood group systems

Contact
- Research center: National Center for Biotechnology Information
- Authors: Olga Blumenfeld and Santosh Patnaik
- Primary citation: PMID 14695527
- Release date: 1999

Access
- Website: ncbi.nlm.nih.gov/gv/rbc
- Download URL: FTP

The BGMUT (Blood Group antigen gene MUTation) Database documents allelic variations in the genes encoding for human blood group systems. It was set up in 1999 through an initiative of the Human Genome Variation Society (HGVS). Since 2006, it has been a part of the dbRBC (database Red Blood Cells) resource of NCBI at the NIH. In addition to being a repository of the genetic variations of the blood group antigen-encoding genes, the database also provides information on the blood group systems, the genes that encode them, the serological phenotypes associated with the alleles of the genes, etc. Information on genetic variations in some non-human orthologous genes is also provided.
