= Hh blood group =

Rare blood type

hh, or the Bombay blood group, is a rare blood type. This blood phenotype was first discovered in Bombay by Dr. Yeshwant Madhav Bhende in 1952. It is mostly found in the Indian subcontinent (India, Bangladesh, Pakistan) and Iran.

== Problems with blood transfusion ==
The first person found to have the Bombay phenotype had a blood type that reacted to other blood types in a way never seen before. The serum contained antibodies that attacked all red blood cells of normal ABO phenotypes. The red blood cells appeared to lack all of the ABO blood group antigens and to have an additional antigen that was previously unknown.

Individuals with the rare Bombay phenotype (hh) do not express H antigen (also called substance H), the antigen which is present in blood group O. As a result, they cannot make A antigen (also called substance A) or B antigen (substance B) on their red blood cells, whatever alleles they may have of the A and B blood-group genes, because A antigen and B antigen are made from H antigen. For this reason, people who have the Bombay phenotype can donate red blood cells to any member of the ABO blood group system (unless some other blood factor gene, such as Rh, is incompatible). For the same reason, they cannot receive blood from any member of the ABO blood group system (which always contains one or more of A, B or H antigens), but only from other people who have the Bombay phenotype.

Receiving blood that contains an antigen which has never been in the patient's own blood causes an immune reaction due to the immune system of a hypothetical receiver producing immunoglobulins against that antigen—in the case of a Bombay patient, not only against antigens A and B, but also against H antigen.

Detecting the Bombay phenotype in an individual is necessary in order to avoid complications during a blood transfusion, but the usual tests for the ABO blood group system would show them as group O. Since anti-H immunoglobulins can activate the complement cascade, it will lead to the lysis of red blood cells while they are still in the circulation, provoking an acute hemolytic transfusion reaction. This cannot be prevented unless those typing the blood and providing care are aware of the existence of the Bombay blood group and have the means to test for it.

== Incidence ==
This very rare phenotype is generally present in about 0.0004% (about 4 per million) of the human population, though in some places such as Mumbai (formerly Bombay) locals can have occurrences in as much as 0.01% (1 in 10,000) of inhabitants. Given that this condition is very rare, any person with this blood group who needs an urgent blood transfusion will probably be unable to get it, as no blood bank would have any in stock. Those anticipating the need for blood transfusion may bank blood for their own use, but this option is not available in cases of accidental injury. For example, by 2017 only one Colombian person was known to have this phenotype, and blood had to be imported from Brazil for a transfusion. In 2023, it was reported that only three registered Brazilians nationwide possessed this phenotype.

== Biochemistry ==
Biosynthesis of the H, A and B antigens involves a series of enzymes (glycosyl transferases) that transfer monosaccharides. The resulting antigens are oligosaccharide chains, which are attached to lipids and proteins that are anchored in the red blood cell membrane. The function of the H antigen, apart from being an intermediate substrate in the synthesis of ABO blood group antigens, is not known, although it may be involved in cell adhesion. People who lack the H antigen do not suffer from deleterious effects, and being H-deficient is only an issue if they need a blood transfusion, because they would need blood without the H antigen present on red blood cells.

The specificity of the H antigen is determined by the sequence of oligosaccharides. More specifically, the minimum requirement for H antigenicity is the terminal disaccharide fucose-galactose, where the fucose has an alpha(1-2)linkage. This antigen is produced by a specific fucosyl transferase (Galactoside 2-alpha-L-fucosyltransferase 2) that catalyzes the final step in the synthesis of the molecule. Depending upon a person's ABO blood type, the H antigen is converted into either the A antigen, B antigen, or both. If a person has group O blood, the H antigen remains unmodified. Therefore, the H antigen is present more in blood type O and less in blood type AB.

Hh antigen system - diagram showing the molecular structure of the ABO(H) antigen system

Two regions of the genome encode two enzymes with very similar substrate specificities: the H locus (FUT1) which encodes the fucosyl transferase and the Se locus (FUT2) that instead indirectly encodes a soluble form of the transferase, which is found in bodily secretions. Both genes are on chromosome 19 at q.13.3. — FUT1 and FUT2 are tightly linked, being only 35 kb apart. Because they are highly homologous, they are likely to have been the result of a gene duplication of a common gene ancestor.

The H locus contains four exons that span more than 8 kb of genomic DNA. Both the Bombay and para-Bombay phenotypes are the result of point mutations in the FUT1 gene. At least one functioning copy of FUT1 needs to be present (H/H or H/h) for the H antigen to be produced on red blood cells. If both copies of FUT1 are inactive (h/h), the Bombay phenotype results. The classical Bombay phenotype is caused by a Tyr316Ter mutation in the coding region of FUT1. The mutation introduces a stop codon, leading to a truncated enzyme that lacks 50 amino acids at the C-terminal end, rendering the enzyme inactive. In Caucasians, the Bombay phenotype may be caused by a number of mutations. Likewise, a number of mutations have been reported to underlie the para-Bombay phenotype. The Se locus contains the FUT2 gene, which is expressed in secretory glands. Individuals who are "secretors" (Se/Se or Se/se) contain at least one copy of a functioning enzyme. They produce a soluble form of H antigen that is found in saliva and other bodily fluids. "Non-secretors" (se/se) do not produce soluble H antigen. The enzyme encoded by FUT2 is also involved in the synthesis of antigens of the Lewis blood group.

== Genetics ==
The Bombay phenotype occurs in individuals who have inherited two recessive alleles of the H gene (i.e. their genotype is hh). These individuals do not produce the H carbohydrate that is the precursor to the A and B antigens, meaning that individuals may possess alleles for either or both of the A and B alleles without being able to express them. Because both parents must carry this recessive allele to transmit this blood type to their children, the condition mainly occurs in small closed-off communities where there is a good chance of both parents of a child either being of Bombay type, or being heterozygous for the h allele and so carrying the Bombay characteristic as recessive. Other examples may include noble families, which are inbred due to custom rather than local genetic variety.

== Clinical diagnostic ==
Clinical testing in patient care for H antigen follows published minimum quality and operational requirements, similar to red cell genotyping for any of the other recognized blood group systems. Molecular analysis can identify gene variants (alleles) that may affect H antigen expression on the red cell membrane.

== Hemolytic disease of the newborn ==
In theory, the maternal production of anti-H during pregnancy might cause hemolytic disease (HDN) in a fetus who did not inherit the mother's Bombay phenotype. In practice, cases of HDN caused in this way have not been described. This may be due to the rarity of the Bombay phenotype. Further, the maternal antibodies would be made against a sugar moiety, which usually elicits just an IgM response, not IgG. IgM does not cross the placenta and thus does not coat the fetal RBCs that would elicit the Hemolytic disease of the newborn.
