= ISBT 128 =

ISBT 128 is a global standard for the identification, labelling, and information transfer of medical products of human origin (MPHO) within and between facilities, across international borders and disparate health care systems. MPHO includes blood, cells, tissues, human milk, and organ products, among others. The Standard is managed by the International Council for Commonality in Blood Banking Automation (ICCBBA).

== History ==
The International Society of Blood Transfusion (ISBT) working group on automation and data processing began in the early 1990s and was later joined by the AABB, the American Red Cross (ARC), the US Department of Defence, and the Health Industry Manufacturers Association in the development of the symbology which would come to be known as the ISBT 128 international standard.

The acronym ISBT was originally derived from the important role played by the International Society of Blood Transfusion (ISBT) in the development of the standard. Today it expands as International Standard for Blood and Transplant. The number 128 reflects the 128 characters of the ASCII 7-bit character set that the standard uses.

The specification was approved for implementation by the ISBT Council at the 23rd ISBT World Congress in Amsterdam, The Netherlands, on 3 July 1994. ICCBBA was established as an independent non-profit entity in 1995 and given the responsibility for the implementation and management of the new standard.

Version 1.0 of the ISBT 128 Standard Technical Specification was published in 1995, and was intended to replace the ABC Codabar and other similar CODABAR-based standards in use in transfusion medicine at that time with a more secure bar code symbology which contains more information. The current version of the ISBT 128 Standard Technical Specification can be found at the ISBT 128 website.

Information transfer involves text on labels, but it also involves information transfer among computer systems. Increasingly, facilities involved in MPHO operate sophisticated computer systems to enhance safety and efficiency. Transfer of information between such facilities by electronic means ensures accuracy, but can only be effectively achieved in a global context by use of internationally agreed standards to define the information environment.

== Specification ==
The ISBT 128 standard provides the specification for many of the elements of the information environment required in transfusion and transplantation. It contains definitions, reference tables, and data structures. Minimum requirements are also defined for delivery mechanisms and labelling. By complying with ISBT 128, collection and processing facilities can provide electronically readable information that can be read by any other compliant system.

ISBT 128 specifies:

- A donation numbering systems that ensures globally unique identification;
- The information to be transferred, using internationally agreed reference tables;
- An international product reference database;
- The data structures in which this information is placed;
- A bar-coding system for transfer of the information on the product label;
- A standard layout for the product label;
- A standard reference for use in electronic messaging.

The delivery mechanism is the means of delivering the electronic information. Probably the most well-known delivery mechanism is the linear bar code that has been used in blood transfusion practice for many years. There are in fact several types of linear bar codes, including Code 128, a bar code standard widely used in coding standards such as GS1 and ISBT 128.

Higher capacity delivery systems are available using 2-dimensional or reduced space symbology bar codes. These codes can carry much more information in each symbol. Data Matrix has been chosen as the 2-D symbology used with ISBT 128 in labelling applications.

ISBT 128 also supports the use of Radio frequency identification (RFID) chips that can carry encoded information, which are being developed for medical products of human origin.

It is important to recognize that a range of delivery systems can sit at this level of the hierarchy. The standardized terminology, reference tables, and data structures of the information standard can be delivered as easily in a linear bar code or 2-D Data Matrix symbol as they can in an RFID tag. The standards themselves need to be adaptable to make best use of new delivery mechanisms as they are developed.

The ISBT 128 Standard also defines the structure for electronic communication of data elements for medical products of human origin. The fundamental elements of traceability – globally unique donation identification, standardized product descriptions, division identification, and processing facility identification – can be incorporated into a single data element, the MPHO Unique Identifier, that other information, such as detailed information on red cell antigen status, can be appended to.

This information can be transmitted via a variety of mechanisms including XML, JSON, and HL7® FHIR® (https://hl7.org/fhir/R5/biologicallyderivedproduct.html). There is an active proposal to include the fundamental elements of MPHO traceability in the United States Core Data for Interoperability.

The final element in the information environment is the associated labelling. Although there will be other labelling requirements that fall outside the information environment described in the ISBT 128 Standard, an effective system needs to consider the physical association between the information and the product. Whether incorporated into a bar code or an electronic tag, there needs to be a mechanism that will ensure correct physical assignment of information to the product, and confidence in the association between electronically stored information and eye-readable printed information. This latter requirement must not be overlooked in the enthusiasm to embrace remotely re-writable tags.

Accreditation bodies such as AABB, EBAA, FACT and JACIE support the use of the ISBT 128 Standard for coding and labelling blood, ocular tissues and human cell and tissue products (HCT/Ps) including cellular therapy products. Furthermore, implementation of the ISBT 128 Standard is required in countries such as Austria, Brazil, Portugal, and Poland. In the European Union, Commission Directive (EU) 2015/565 recognizes the ISBT 128 Standard as one of three permitted coding systems within the European Union’s Single European Code for tissue and cells distributed with the European Union.
