= FUT1 =

Protein and coding gene in humans

Identifiers
- Aliases: FUT1, HH, HSC, fucosyltransferase 1 (H blood group), H
- External IDs: OMIM: 211100; MGI: 109375; GeneCards: FUT1
Enzyme activity
EC #	BRENDA	ExPASy	KEGG	MetaCyc
2.4.1.69	↗	↗	↗	↗
2.4.1.344	↗	↗	↗	↗

Gene location (Human)
Chr.	Chromosome 19 (human)
Band	19q13.33	Start	48,748,011 bp
Band	19q13.33	End	48,755,390 bp

Gene location (Mouse)
Chr.	Chromosome 7 (mouse)
Band	7 B3|7 29.39 cM	Start	45,266,713 bp
Band	7 B3|7 29.39 cM	End	45,270,483 bp
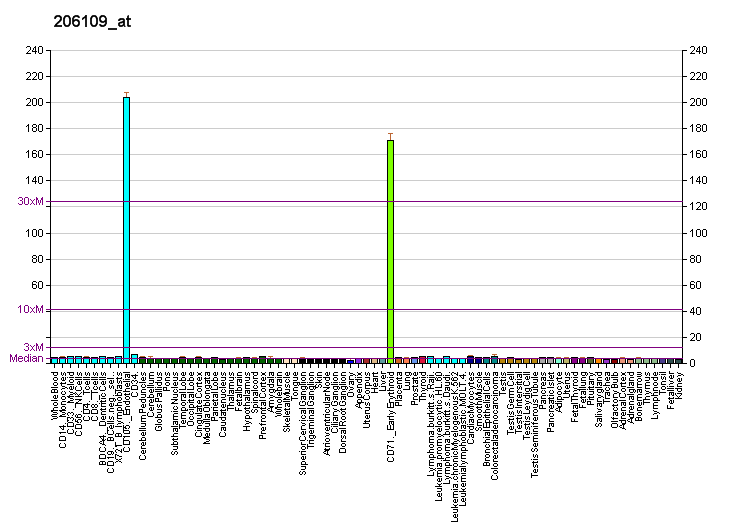
RNA expression pattern
Bgee	Human / Mouse (ortholog); Top expressed in: body of pancreas; paraflocculus of cerebellum; upper lobe of left lung; body of stomach; right lung; buccal mucosa cell; palpebral conjunctiva; gingival epithelium; middle temporal gyrus; apex of heart / Top expressed in: lip; embryo; esophagus; skin of external ear; thymus; spermatid; skin of back; epidermis; epiblast; jejunum; More reference expression data
BioGPS	More reference expression data
Gene ontology
Molecular function	transferase activity; galactoside 2-alpha-L-fucosyltransferase activity; fucosyltransferase activity; glycosyltransferase activity
Cellular component	integral component of membrane; Golgi cisterna membrane; Golgi apparatus; integral component of plasma membrane; membrane
Biological process	protein glycosylation; L-fucose catabolic process; fucosylation; carbohydrate metabolic process
Sources:Amigo / QuickGO
Orthologs
Databases	NCBI: entry; OMA: entry
Species	Human	Mouse
Entrez	2523	14343
Ensembl	ENSG00000174951	ENSMUSG00000008461
UniProt	P19526	O09160
RefSeq (mRNA)	NM_000148; NM_001329877; NM_001384359	NM_001271981; NM_008051
RefSeq (protein)	NP_000139; NP_001316806	NP_001258910; NP_032077
Location (UCSC)	Chr 19: 48.75 – 48.76 Mb	Chr 7: 45.27 – 45.27 Mb
PubMed search
- Wikidata
View/Edit Human	View/Edit Mouse

Galactoside 2-alpha-L-fucosyltransferase 1 is an enzyme that in humans is encoded by the FUT1 gene.

The enzyme is involved in the synthesis of the H antigen.
