= Histo-blood group ABO system transferase =

Protein-coding gene in the species Homo sapiens

ABO
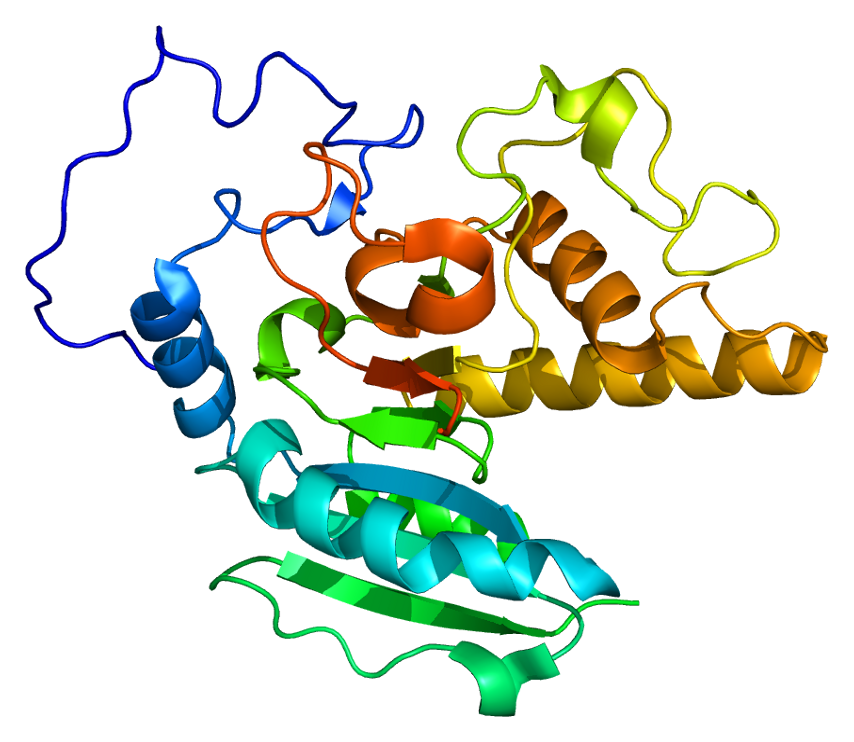

Identifiers
- Aliases: ABO, A3GALNT, A3GALT1, GTB, NAGAT, ABO blood group (transferase A, alpha 1-3-N-acetylgalactosaminyltransferase; transferase B, alpha 1-3-galactosyltransferase), alpha 1-3-N-acetylgalactosaminyltransferase and alpha 1-3-galactosyltransferase
- External IDs: OMIM: 110300; MGI: 2135738; GeneCards: ABO
Available structures
PDB	Ortholog search: PDBe RCSB
PDB	List of PDB id codes 1LZ0, 1LZ7, 1LZI, 1LZJ, 1R7T, 1R7U, 1R7V, 1R7X, 1R7Y, 1R80, 1R81, 1R82, 1WSZ, 1WT0, 1WT1, 1WT2, 1WT3, 1XZ6, 1ZHJ, 1ZI1, 1ZI3, 1ZI4, 1ZI5, 1ZIZ, 1ZJ0, 1ZJ1, 1ZJ2, 1ZJ3, 1ZJO, 1ZJP, 2A8U, 2A8W, 2I7B, 2O1F, 2O1G, 2O1H, 2PGV, 2RIT, 2RIX, 2RIY, 2RIZ, 2RJ0, 2RJ1, 2RJ4, 2RJ5, 2RJ6, 2RJ7, 2RJ8, 2RJ9, 2Y7A, 3I0C, 3I0D, 3I0E, 3I0F, 3I0G, 3I0H, 3I0I, 3I0J, 3I0K, 3I0L, 3IOH, 3IOI, 3IOJ, 3SX3, 3SX5, 3SX7, 3SX8, 3SXA, 3SXB, 3SXC, 3SXD, 3SXE, 3SXG, 3U0X, 3U0Y, 3V0L, 3V0M, 3V0N, 3V0O, 3V0P, 3V0Q, 3ZGF, 4C2S, 4KC1, 4KC2, 4KC4, 3ZGG, 4FQW, 4FRA, 4FRB, 4FRD, 4FRE, 4FRH, 4FRL, 4FRO, 4FRP, 4FRQ, 4GBP, 4KXO, 4Y62, 4Y63, 4Y64, 5BXC, 5C1G, 5C1H, 5C1L, 5C36, 5C38, 5C3A, 5C3B, 5C3D, 5C47, 5C48, 5C49, 5C4B, 5C4C, 5C4D, 5C4E, 5C4F, 5C8R, 5CMI, 2PGY
Enzyme activity
EC #	BRENDA	ExPASy	KEGG	MetaCyc
2.4.1.37	↗	↗	↗	↗
2.4.1.40	↗	↗	↗	↗

Gene location (Human)
Chr.	Chromosome 9 (human)
Band	9q34.2	Start	133,233,278 bp
Band	9q34.2	End	133,276,024 bp

Gene location (Mouse)
Chr.	Chromosome 2 (mouse)
Band	2|2 A3	Start	26,732,515 bp
Band	2|2 A3	End	26,754,991 bp
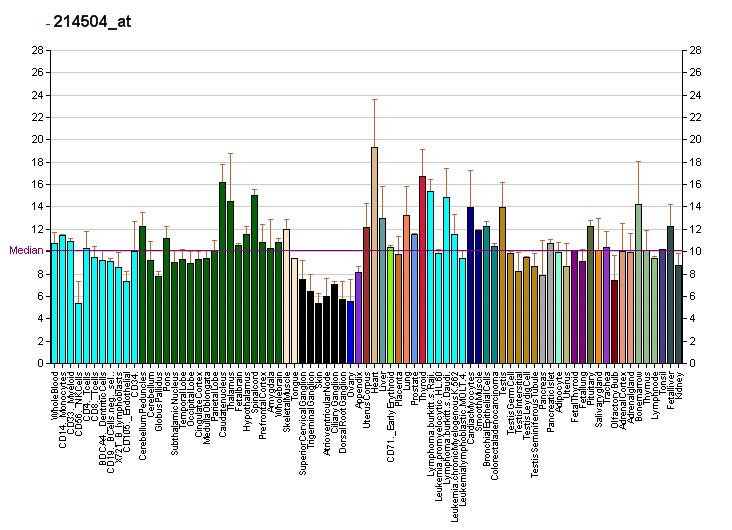

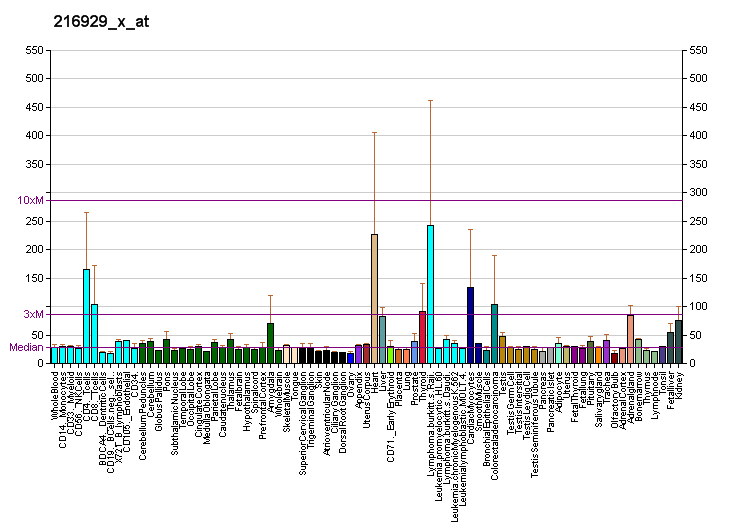
RNA expression pattern
Bgee	Human / Mouse (ortholog); Top expressed in: tendon of biceps brachii; buccal mucosa cell; right lobe of thyroid gland; right uterine tube; left lobe of thyroid gland; left ovary; rectum; right adrenal cortex; left adrenal gland; left adrenal cortex / Top expressed in: submandibular gland; lacrimal gland; morula; parotid gland; spermatocyte; esophagus; blastocyst; embryo; seminal vesicula; transitional epithelium of urinary bladder; More reference expression data
BioGPS	More reference expression data
Gene ontology
Molecular function	transferase activity; hexosyltransferase activity; metal ion binding; fucosylgalactoside 3-alpha-galactosyltransferase activity; glycoprotein-fucosylgalactoside alpha-N-acetylgalactosaminyltransferase activity; glycosyltransferase activity; nucleotide binding; antigen binding; manganese ion binding
Cellular component	integral component of membrane; extracellular region; Golgi cisterna membrane; membrane; Golgi apparatus; vesicle
Biological process	protein glycosylation; glycolipid biosynthetic process; lipid glycosylation; carbohydrate metabolic process
Sources:Amigo / QuickGO
Orthologs
Databases	NCBI: entry; OMA: entry
Species	Human	Mouse
Entrez	28	80908
Ensembl	ENSG00000175164; ENSG00000281879	ENSMUSG00000015787
UniProt	P16442	P38649
RefSeq (mRNA)	NM_020469	NM_030718; NM_001290444
RefSeq (protein)	NP_065202	NP_001277373; NP_109643
Location (UCSC)	Chr 9: 133.23 – 133.28 Mb	Chr 2: 26.73 – 26.75 Mb
PubMed search
- Wikidata
View/Edit Human	View/Edit Mouse

Histo-blood group ABO system transferase is an enzyme with glycosyltransferase activity, which is encoded by the ABO gene in humans. It is ubiquitously expressed in many tissues and cell types. ABO determines the ABO blood group of an individual by modifying the oligosaccharides on cell surface glycoproteins. Variations in the sequence of the protein between individuals determine the type of modification and the blood group. The ABO gene also contains one of 27 SNPs associated with increased risk of coronary artery disease.

== Alleles ==
The ABO gene resides on chromosome 9 at the band 9q34.2 and contains 7 exons. The ABO locus encodes three alleles, that is, 3 variants of the same gene. One allele is derived from each parent.

The A allele produces α-1,3-N-acetylgalactosamine transferase (A-transferase), which catalyzes the transfer of GalNAc residues from the UDP-GalNAc donor nucleotide to the Gal residues of the acceptor H antigen, converting the H antigen into A antigen in A and AB individuals.

The B allele encodes α-1,3-galactosyl transferase (B-transferase), which catalyzes the transfer of Gal residues from the UDP-Gal donor nucleotide to the Gal residues of the acceptor H antigen, converting the H antigen into B antigen in B and AB individuals. Remarkably, the difference between the A and B glycosyltransferase enzymes is only four amino acids.

The O allele lacks both enzymatic activities because of the frameshift caused by a deletion of guanine-258 in the gene which corresponds to a region near the N-terminus of the protein. This results in a frameshift and thus of a truncated protein of only 117 amino acids. The truncated protein is unable to modify oligosaccharides which end in fucose linked to galactose. Thus no A or B antigen is found in O individuals. This sugar combination is termed the H antigen. These antigens play an important role in the match of blood transfusion and organ transplantation. Other minor alleles have been found for this gene.

=== Common alleles ===
There are six common alleles in individuals of European descent. Nearly every living human's phenotype for the ABO gene is some combination of just these six alleles:

- A
  - A101 (A1)
  - A201 (A2)
- B
  - B101 (B1)
- O
  - O01 (O1)
  - O02 (O1v)
  - O03 (O2)

Many rare variants of these alleles have been found in human populations around the world.

== Clinical significance ==
In human cells, the ABO alleles and their encoded glycosyltransferases have been described in several oncologic conditions. Using anti-GTA/GTB monoclonal antibodies, it was demonstrated that a loss of these enzymes was correlated to malignant bladder and oral epithelia. Furthermore, the expression of ABO blood group antigens in normal human tissues is dependent upon the type of differentiation of the epithelium. In most human carcinomas, including oral carcinoma, a significant event as part of the underlying mechanism is decreased expression of the A and B antigens. Several studies have observed that a relative down-regulation of GTA and GTB occurs in oral carcinomas in association with tumor development. More recently, a genome wide association study (GWAS) has identified variants in the ABO locus associated with susceptibility to pancreatic cancer.

=== Clinical marker ===
A multi-locus genetic risk score study based on a combination of 27 loci, including the ABO gene, identified individuals at increased risk for both incident and recurrent coronary artery disease events, as well as an enhanced clinical benefit from statin therapy. The study was based on a community cohort study (the Malmo Diet and Cancer study) and four additional randomized controlled trials of primary prevention cohorts (JUPITER and ASCOT) and secondary prevention cohorts (CARE and PROVE IT-TIMI 22).

== See also ==
- RHD (gene)
