= H antigen =

Antigens with different biological functions

H antigen can refer to one of the various types of antigens having diverse biological functions:

- Also known as substance H, H antigen is a precursor to each of the ABO blood group antigens, apparently present in all people except those with the Bombay Blood phenotype (see hh blood group). The gene responsible for making H antigen is FUT1, located on the 19th chromosome in humans.
- Histocompatibility antigen, a major factor in graft rejection.
  - major H antigens (major histocompatibility antigen) "encode molecules that present foreign peptides to T cells"
  - minor H antigens are polymorphic alloantigens presented on foreign major histocompatibility complex molecules. Includes, e.g. the H-Y antigen. Even when major histocompatibility complex genotype is perfectly matched, can cause slow rejection of a graft.
- a bacterial flagellar antigen
